

511001–511100 

|-bgcolor=#fefefe
| 511001 ||  || — || November 26, 2011 || Mount Lemmon || Mount Lemmon Survey || H || align=right data-sort-value="0.72" | 720 m || 
|-id=002 bgcolor=#FFC2E0
| 511002 ||  || — || June 18, 2013 || Haleakala || Pan-STARRS || AMO || align=right data-sort-value="0.33" | 330 m || 
|-id=003 bgcolor=#fefefe
| 511003 ||  || — || September 2, 2010 || Mount Lemmon || Mount Lemmon Survey ||  || align=right data-sort-value="0.74" | 740 m || 
|-id=004 bgcolor=#fefefe
| 511004 ||  || — || December 3, 2010 || Mount Lemmon || Mount Lemmon Survey ||  || align=right data-sort-value="0.75" | 750 m || 
|-id=005 bgcolor=#fefefe
| 511005 ||  || — || July 28, 2013 || Kitt Peak || Spacewatch ||  || align=right data-sort-value="0.55" | 550 m || 
|-id=006 bgcolor=#FA8072
| 511006 ||  || — || November 19, 2003 || Kitt Peak || Spacewatch ||  || align=right data-sort-value="0.61" | 610 m || 
|-id=007 bgcolor=#fefefe
| 511007 ||  || — || March 23, 2006 || Kitt Peak || Spacewatch ||  || align=right data-sort-value="0.62" | 620 m || 
|-id=008 bgcolor=#FFC2E0
| 511008 ||  || — || January 12, 2010 || WISE || WISE || APOPHAcritical || align=right | 1.6 km || 
|-id=009 bgcolor=#fefefe
| 511009 ||  || — || January 31, 2008 || Mount Lemmon || Mount Lemmon Survey ||  || align=right data-sort-value="0.68" | 680 m || 
|-id=010 bgcolor=#fefefe
| 511010 ||  || — || August 28, 2006 || Kitt Peak || Spacewatch ||  || align=right data-sort-value="0.65" | 650 m || 
|-id=011 bgcolor=#fefefe
| 511011 ||  || — || March 2, 2009 || Kitt Peak || Spacewatch ||  || align=right data-sort-value="0.62" | 620 m || 
|-id=012 bgcolor=#fefefe
| 511012 ||  || — || May 12, 1996 || Kitt Peak || Spacewatch ||  || align=right data-sort-value="0.75" | 750 m || 
|-id=013 bgcolor=#fefefe
| 511013 ||  || — || February 27, 2012 || Haleakala || Pan-STARRS ||  || align=right data-sort-value="0.62" | 620 m || 
|-id=014 bgcolor=#fefefe
| 511014 ||  || — || July 21, 2006 || Mount Lemmon || Mount Lemmon Survey ||  || align=right data-sort-value="0.63" | 630 m || 
|-id=015 bgcolor=#fefefe
| 511015 ||  || — || October 2, 2006 || Mount Lemmon || Mount Lemmon Survey || NYS || align=right data-sort-value="0.52" | 520 m || 
|-id=016 bgcolor=#fefefe
| 511016 ||  || — || December 22, 2003 || Kitt Peak || Spacewatch ||  || align=right | 1.2 km || 
|-id=017 bgcolor=#fefefe
| 511017 ||  || — || September 18, 2006 || Socorro || LINEAR ||  || align=right data-sort-value="0.62" | 620 m || 
|-id=018 bgcolor=#fefefe
| 511018 ||  || — || September 21, 2003 || Kitt Peak || Spacewatch ||  || align=right data-sort-value="0.51" | 510 m || 
|-id=019 bgcolor=#FA8072
| 511019 ||  || — || June 18, 2013 || Catalina || CSS ||  || align=right data-sort-value="0.93" | 930 m || 
|-id=020 bgcolor=#fefefe
| 511020 ||  || — || October 5, 2003 || Kitt Peak || Spacewatch ||  || align=right data-sort-value="0.85" | 850 m || 
|-id=021 bgcolor=#fefefe
| 511021 ||  || — || March 28, 2008 || Mount Lemmon || Mount Lemmon Survey ||  || align=right data-sort-value="0.67" | 670 m || 
|-id=022 bgcolor=#fefefe
| 511022 ||  || — || January 11, 2008 || Mount Lemmon || Mount Lemmon Survey ||  || align=right data-sort-value="0.65" | 650 m || 
|-id=023 bgcolor=#fefefe
| 511023 ||  || — || February 10, 2008 || Kitt Peak || Spacewatch || (2076) || align=right data-sort-value="0.78" | 780 m || 
|-id=024 bgcolor=#fefefe
| 511024 ||  || — || August 12, 2013 || Haleakala || Pan-STARRS ||  || align=right data-sort-value="0.68" | 680 m || 
|-id=025 bgcolor=#fefefe
| 511025 ||  || — || November 21, 2003 || Socorro || LINEAR ||  || align=right data-sort-value="0.75" | 750 m || 
|-id=026 bgcolor=#fefefe
| 511026 ||  || — || April 18, 2009 || Mount Lemmon || Mount Lemmon Survey ||  || align=right data-sort-value="0.66" | 660 m || 
|-id=027 bgcolor=#fefefe
| 511027 ||  || — || December 30, 2007 || Mount Lemmon || Mount Lemmon Survey ||  || align=right data-sort-value="0.66" | 660 m || 
|-id=028 bgcolor=#fefefe
| 511028 ||  || — || December 10, 2010 || Mount Lemmon || Mount Lemmon Survey ||  || align=right data-sort-value="0.45" | 450 m || 
|-id=029 bgcolor=#fefefe
| 511029 ||  || — || December 30, 2007 || Mount Lemmon || Mount Lemmon Survey ||  || align=right data-sort-value="0.51" | 510 m || 
|-id=030 bgcolor=#fefefe
| 511030 ||  || — || March 23, 2012 || Mount Lemmon || Mount Lemmon Survey ||  || align=right data-sort-value="0.80" | 800 m || 
|-id=031 bgcolor=#fefefe
| 511031 ||  || — || October 16, 2003 || Kitt Peak || Spacewatch ||  || align=right data-sort-value="0.57" | 570 m || 
|-id=032 bgcolor=#fefefe
| 511032 ||  || — || November 21, 2003 || Kitt Peak || Spacewatch ||  || align=right data-sort-value="0.69" | 690 m || 
|-id=033 bgcolor=#fefefe
| 511033 ||  || — || January 10, 2008 || Mount Lemmon || Mount Lemmon Survey ||  || align=right data-sort-value="0.63" | 630 m || 
|-id=034 bgcolor=#fefefe
| 511034 ||  || — || August 29, 2006 || Kitt Peak || Spacewatch || (2076) || align=right data-sort-value="0.61" | 610 m || 
|-id=035 bgcolor=#fefefe
| 511035 ||  || — || December 2, 2010 || Mount Lemmon || Mount Lemmon Survey ||  || align=right data-sort-value="0.75" | 750 m || 
|-id=036 bgcolor=#fefefe
| 511036 ||  || — || January 30, 2011 || Haleakala || Pan-STARRS ||  || align=right data-sort-value="0.99" | 990 m || 
|-id=037 bgcolor=#fefefe
| 511037 ||  || — || November 5, 2003 || Anderson Mesa || LONEOS ||  || align=right data-sort-value="0.83" | 830 m || 
|-id=038 bgcolor=#fefefe
| 511038 ||  || — || December 5, 2010 || Kitt Peak || Spacewatch ||  || align=right data-sort-value="0.68" | 680 m || 
|-id=039 bgcolor=#fefefe
| 511039 ||  || — || March 7, 2008 || Mount Lemmon || Mount Lemmon Survey || (1338) || align=right data-sort-value="0.53" | 530 m || 
|-id=040 bgcolor=#fefefe
| 511040 ||  || — || January 29, 2011 || Kitt Peak || Spacewatch ||  || align=right data-sort-value="0.66" | 660 m || 
|-id=041 bgcolor=#fefefe
| 511041 ||  || — || September 14, 1999 || Kitt Peak || Spacewatch ||  || align=right data-sort-value="0.58" | 580 m || 
|-id=042 bgcolor=#fefefe
| 511042 ||  || — || September 16, 2010 || Mount Lemmon || Mount Lemmon Survey ||  || align=right data-sort-value="0.64" | 640 m || 
|-id=043 bgcolor=#fefefe
| 511043 ||  || — || February 27, 2012 || Haleakala || Pan-STARRS ||  || align=right data-sort-value="0.67" | 670 m || 
|-id=044 bgcolor=#fefefe
| 511044 ||  || — || September 20, 2006 || Kitt Peak || Spacewatch ||  || align=right data-sort-value="0.75" | 750 m || 
|-id=045 bgcolor=#C2FFFF
| 511045 ||  || — || August 15, 2013 || Haleakala || Pan-STARRS || L5 || align=right | 7.3 km || 
|-id=046 bgcolor=#fefefe
| 511046 ||  || — || November 22, 2006 || Kitt Peak || Spacewatch ||  || align=right data-sort-value="0.67" | 670 m || 
|-id=047 bgcolor=#fefefe
| 511047 ||  || — || September 16, 2006 || Kitt Peak || Spacewatch || (2076) || align=right data-sort-value="0.62" | 620 m || 
|-id=048 bgcolor=#fefefe
| 511048 ||  || — || October 4, 2006 || Mount Lemmon || Mount Lemmon Survey ||  || align=right data-sort-value="0.72" | 720 m || 
|-id=049 bgcolor=#fefefe
| 511049 ||  || — || October 3, 2006 || Mount Lemmon || Mount Lemmon Survey ||  || align=right data-sort-value="0.68" | 680 m || 
|-id=050 bgcolor=#E9E9E9
| 511050 ||  || — || September 15, 2013 || Catalina || CSS ||  || align=right data-sort-value="0.83" | 830 m || 
|-id=051 bgcolor=#fefefe
| 511051 ||  || — || August 19, 2006 || Kitt Peak || Spacewatch ||  || align=right data-sort-value="0.64" | 640 m || 
|-id=052 bgcolor=#fefefe
| 511052 ||  || — || August 18, 2009 || Kitt Peak || Spacewatch || NYS || align=right data-sort-value="0.62" | 620 m || 
|-id=053 bgcolor=#fefefe
| 511053 ||  || — || February 7, 2008 || Mount Lemmon || Mount Lemmon Survey ||  || align=right data-sort-value="0.63" | 630 m || 
|-id=054 bgcolor=#fefefe
| 511054 ||  || — || November 15, 2010 || Mount Lemmon || Mount Lemmon Survey ||  || align=right data-sort-value="0.55" | 550 m || 
|-id=055 bgcolor=#fefefe
| 511055 ||  || — || December 24, 2006 || Kitt Peak || Spacewatch ||  || align=right data-sort-value="0.77" | 770 m || 
|-id=056 bgcolor=#C2FFFF
| 511056 ||  || — || August 13, 2012 || Haleakala || Pan-STARRS || L5 || align=right | 8.5 km || 
|-id=057 bgcolor=#fefefe
| 511057 ||  || — || February 9, 2008 || Kitt Peak || Spacewatch ||  || align=right data-sort-value="0.60" | 600 m || 
|-id=058 bgcolor=#fefefe
| 511058 ||  || — || September 5, 2013 || Kitt Peak || Spacewatch ||  || align=right data-sort-value="0.69" | 690 m || 
|-id=059 bgcolor=#fefefe
| 511059 ||  || — || January 14, 2008 || Kitt Peak || Spacewatch ||  || align=right data-sort-value="0.60" | 600 m || 
|-id=060 bgcolor=#fefefe
| 511060 ||  || — || September 15, 2006 || Kitt Peak || Spacewatch ||  || align=right data-sort-value="0.85" | 850 m || 
|-id=061 bgcolor=#FA8072
| 511061 ||  || — || September 27, 2006 || Mount Lemmon || Mount Lemmon Survey ||  || align=right data-sort-value="0.74" | 740 m || 
|-id=062 bgcolor=#fefefe
| 511062 ||  || — || November 17, 2006 || Mount Lemmon || Mount Lemmon Survey ||  || align=right data-sort-value="0.76" | 760 m || 
|-id=063 bgcolor=#fefefe
| 511063 ||  || — || December 8, 2010 || Mount Lemmon || Mount Lemmon Survey ||  || align=right data-sort-value="0.76" | 760 m || 
|-id=064 bgcolor=#FFC2E0
| 511064 ||  || — || October 2, 2013 || Catalina || CSS || AMO +1kmcritical || align=right | 1.1 km || 
|-id=065 bgcolor=#fefefe
| 511065 ||  || — || August 15, 2013 || Haleakala || Pan-STARRS ||  || align=right data-sort-value="0.98" | 980 m || 
|-id=066 bgcolor=#fefefe
| 511066 ||  || — || January 12, 2011 || Mount Lemmon || Mount Lemmon Survey || MAS || align=right data-sort-value="0.72" | 720 m || 
|-id=067 bgcolor=#FA8072
| 511067 ||  || — || October 1, 2006 || Catalina || CSS ||  || align=right data-sort-value="0.70" | 700 m || 
|-id=068 bgcolor=#fefefe
| 511068 ||  || — || January 30, 2011 || Haleakala || Pan-STARRS || NYS || align=right data-sort-value="0.51" | 510 m || 
|-id=069 bgcolor=#fefefe
| 511069 ||  || — || November 2, 2006 || Mount Lemmon || Mount Lemmon Survey ||  || align=right | 1.2 km || 
|-id=070 bgcolor=#fefefe
| 511070 ||  || — || February 13, 2011 || Mount Lemmon || Mount Lemmon Survey || NYS || align=right data-sort-value="0.61" | 610 m || 
|-id=071 bgcolor=#E9E9E9
| 511071 ||  || — || September 12, 2013 || Mount Lemmon || Mount Lemmon Survey ||  || align=right | 1.1 km || 
|-id=072 bgcolor=#fefefe
| 511072 ||  || — || January 30, 2011 || Haleakala || Pan-STARRS ||  || align=right data-sort-value="0.74" | 740 m || 
|-id=073 bgcolor=#fefefe
| 511073 ||  || — || August 19, 2009 || La Sagra || OAM Obs. || MAS || align=right data-sort-value="0.78" | 780 m || 
|-id=074 bgcolor=#fefefe
| 511074 ||  || — || October 18, 2006 || Kitt Peak || Spacewatch ||  || align=right data-sort-value="0.64" | 640 m || 
|-id=075 bgcolor=#FA8072
| 511075 ||  || — || October 19, 2006 || Catalina || CSS ||  || align=right data-sort-value="0.79" | 790 m || 
|-id=076 bgcolor=#fefefe
| 511076 ||  || — || October 16, 2010 || La Sagra || OAM Obs. ||  || align=right | 1.1 km || 
|-id=077 bgcolor=#fefefe
| 511077 ||  || — || October 18, 2003 || Kitt Peak || Spacewatch ||  || align=right data-sort-value="0.55" | 550 m || 
|-id=078 bgcolor=#fefefe
| 511078 ||  || — || October 4, 2013 || Mount Lemmon || Mount Lemmon Survey ||  || align=right data-sort-value="0.59" | 590 m || 
|-id=079 bgcolor=#fefefe
| 511079 ||  || — || September 30, 2006 || Mount Lemmon || Mount Lemmon Survey ||  || align=right data-sort-value="0.62" | 620 m || 
|-id=080 bgcolor=#fefefe
| 511080 ||  || — || December 27, 2006 || Mount Lemmon || Mount Lemmon Survey || MAS || align=right data-sort-value="0.57" | 570 m || 
|-id=081 bgcolor=#fefefe
| 511081 ||  || — || September 6, 2013 || Kitt Peak || Spacewatch ||  || align=right data-sort-value="0.69" | 690 m || 
|-id=082 bgcolor=#fefefe
| 511082 ||  || — || September 6, 2013 || Kitt Peak || Spacewatch ||  || align=right data-sort-value="0.65" | 650 m || 
|-id=083 bgcolor=#fefefe
| 511083 ||  || — || October 5, 2003 || Socorro || LINEAR ||  || align=right data-sort-value="0.77" | 770 m || 
|-id=084 bgcolor=#fefefe
| 511084 ||  || — || January 24, 2007 || Mount Lemmon || Mount Lemmon Survey || NYS || align=right data-sort-value="0.57" | 570 m || 
|-id=085 bgcolor=#fefefe
| 511085 ||  || — || October 2, 2013 || Kitt Peak || Spacewatch ||  || align=right data-sort-value="0.70" | 700 m || 
|-id=086 bgcolor=#fefefe
| 511086 ||  || — || November 21, 2006 || Mount Lemmon || Mount Lemmon Survey ||  || align=right data-sort-value="0.67" | 670 m || 
|-id=087 bgcolor=#fefefe
| 511087 ||  || — || December 12, 2006 || Mount Lemmon || Mount Lemmon Survey || MAS || align=right data-sort-value="0.68" | 680 m || 
|-id=088 bgcolor=#fefefe
| 511088 ||  || — || January 26, 2011 || Mount Lemmon || Mount Lemmon Survey ||  || align=right data-sort-value="0.69" | 690 m || 
|-id=089 bgcolor=#fefefe
| 511089 ||  || — || November 2, 2006 || Mount Lemmon || Mount Lemmon Survey ||  || align=right data-sort-value="0.64" | 640 m || 
|-id=090 bgcolor=#fefefe
| 511090 ||  || — || April 19, 2012 || Mount Lemmon || Mount Lemmon Survey ||  || align=right data-sort-value="0.65" | 650 m || 
|-id=091 bgcolor=#fefefe
| 511091 ||  || — || October 4, 2006 || Mount Lemmon || Mount Lemmon Survey ||  || align=right data-sort-value="0.69" | 690 m || 
|-id=092 bgcolor=#fefefe
| 511092 ||  || — || October 3, 2006 || Mount Lemmon || Mount Lemmon Survey ||  || align=right data-sort-value="0.51" | 510 m || 
|-id=093 bgcolor=#fefefe
| 511093 ||  || — || December 26, 2006 || Kitt Peak || Spacewatch ||  || align=right data-sort-value="0.73" | 730 m || 
|-id=094 bgcolor=#fefefe
| 511094 ||  || — || November 19, 2006 || Kitt Peak || Spacewatch ||  || align=right data-sort-value="0.72" | 720 m || 
|-id=095 bgcolor=#fefefe
| 511095 ||  || — || September 16, 2009 || Catalina || CSS ||  || align=right data-sort-value="0.84" | 840 m || 
|-id=096 bgcolor=#FA8072
| 511096 ||  || — || September 12, 2013 || Catalina || CSS ||  || align=right | 1.8 km || 
|-id=097 bgcolor=#fefefe
| 511097 ||  || — || March 10, 2008 || Mount Lemmon || Mount Lemmon Survey ||  || align=right data-sort-value="0.67" | 670 m || 
|-id=098 bgcolor=#fefefe
| 511098 ||  || — || December 15, 2006 || Kitt Peak || Spacewatch || MAS || align=right data-sort-value="0.53" | 530 m || 
|-id=099 bgcolor=#C2FFFF
| 511099 ||  || — || October 2, 2013 || Mount Lemmon || Mount Lemmon Survey || L5 || align=right | 6.5 km || 
|-id=100 bgcolor=#fefefe
| 511100 ||  || — || July 14, 2009 || Kitt Peak || Spacewatch ||  || align=right data-sort-value="0.95" | 950 m || 
|}

511101–511200 

|-bgcolor=#fefefe
| 511101 ||  || — || January 17, 2007 || Kitt Peak || Spacewatch || MAS || align=right data-sort-value="0.75" | 750 m || 
|-id=102 bgcolor=#fefefe
| 511102 ||  || — || October 14, 2013 || Catalina || CSS ||  || align=right | 1.2 km || 
|-id=103 bgcolor=#E9E9E9
| 511103 ||  || — || February 23, 2011 || Kitt Peak || Spacewatch ||  || align=right data-sort-value="0.98" | 980 m || 
|-id=104 bgcolor=#fefefe
| 511104 ||  || — || May 24, 2006 || Mount Lemmon || Mount Lemmon Survey ||  || align=right data-sort-value="0.78" | 780 m || 
|-id=105 bgcolor=#fefefe
| 511105 ||  || — || October 12, 2013 || Catalina || CSS ||  || align=right data-sort-value="0.71" | 710 m || 
|-id=106 bgcolor=#fefefe
| 511106 ||  || — || March 29, 2011 || Mount Lemmon || Mount Lemmon Survey ||  || align=right data-sort-value="0.69" | 690 m || 
|-id=107 bgcolor=#E9E9E9
| 511107 ||  || — || February 15, 2010 || Mount Lemmon || Mount Lemmon Survey ||  || align=right data-sort-value="0.79" | 790 m || 
|-id=108 bgcolor=#FA8072
| 511108 ||  || — || November 21, 1995 || Kitt Peak || Spacewatch ||  || align=right data-sort-value="0.80" | 800 m || 
|-id=109 bgcolor=#E9E9E9
| 511109 ||  || — || March 19, 2010 || WISE || WISE ||  || align=right | 4.1 km || 
|-id=110 bgcolor=#fefefe
| 511110 ||  || — || October 14, 2009 || Mount Lemmon || Mount Lemmon Survey ||  || align=right data-sort-value="0.88" | 880 m || 
|-id=111 bgcolor=#fefefe
| 511111 ||  || — || October 25, 2013 || Kitt Peak || Spacewatch ||  || align=right data-sort-value="0.73" | 730 m || 
|-id=112 bgcolor=#fefefe
| 511112 ||  || — || November 27, 2013 || Haleakala || Pan-STARRS ||  || align=right data-sort-value="0.74" | 740 m || 
|-id=113 bgcolor=#fefefe
| 511113 ||  || — || October 12, 1998 || Kitt Peak || Spacewatch ||  || align=right data-sort-value="0.67" | 670 m || 
|-id=114 bgcolor=#FA8072
| 511114 ||  || — || September 26, 2009 || Kitt Peak || Spacewatch ||  || align=right data-sort-value="0.83" | 830 m || 
|-id=115 bgcolor=#fefefe
| 511115 ||  || — || August 21, 2009 || La Sagra || OAM Obs. ||  || align=right data-sort-value="0.76" | 760 m || 
|-id=116 bgcolor=#fefefe
| 511116 ||  || — || March 11, 2011 || Kitt Peak || Spacewatch ||  || align=right data-sort-value="0.71" | 710 m || 
|-id=117 bgcolor=#fefefe
| 511117 ||  || — || January 26, 2007 || Kitt Peak || Spacewatch || NYS || align=right data-sort-value="0.61" | 610 m || 
|-id=118 bgcolor=#fefefe
| 511118 ||  || — || November 19, 1995 || Kitt Peak || Spacewatch ||  || align=right data-sort-value="0.64" | 640 m || 
|-id=119 bgcolor=#fefefe
| 511119 ||  || — || January 24, 2007 || Mount Lemmon || Mount Lemmon Survey ||  || align=right data-sort-value="0.71" | 710 m || 
|-id=120 bgcolor=#fefefe
| 511120 ||  || — || August 29, 2009 || Kitt Peak || Spacewatch ||  || align=right data-sort-value="0.65" | 650 m || 
|-id=121 bgcolor=#fefefe
| 511121 ||  || — || September 13, 1998 || Kitt Peak || Spacewatch || MAS || align=right data-sort-value="0.71" | 710 m || 
|-id=122 bgcolor=#fefefe
| 511122 ||  || — || September 20, 2009 || Kitt Peak || Spacewatch ||  || align=right data-sort-value="0.71" | 710 m || 
|-id=123 bgcolor=#fefefe
| 511123 ||  || — || August 18, 2009 || Kitt Peak || Spacewatch || MAS || align=right data-sort-value="0.71" | 710 m || 
|-id=124 bgcolor=#E9E9E9
| 511124 ||  || — || March 27, 2011 || Kitt Peak || Spacewatch ||  || align=right | 1.3 km || 
|-id=125 bgcolor=#fefefe
| 511125 ||  || — || November 9, 2013 || Haleakala || Pan-STARRS || V || align=right data-sort-value="0.82" | 820 m || 
|-id=126 bgcolor=#E9E9E9
| 511126 ||  || — || May 12, 2011 || Mount Lemmon || Mount Lemmon Survey || HNS || align=right | 1.3 km || 
|-id=127 bgcolor=#E9E9E9
| 511127 ||  || — || December 1, 1996 || Kitt Peak || Spacewatch ||  || align=right | 1.5 km || 
|-id=128 bgcolor=#fefefe
| 511128 ||  || — || October 9, 2013 || Mount Lemmon || Mount Lemmon Survey ||  || align=right data-sort-value="0.82" | 820 m || 
|-id=129 bgcolor=#E9E9E9
| 511129 ||  || — || October 27, 2013 || Catalina || CSS ||  || align=right | 2.9 km || 
|-id=130 bgcolor=#C7FF8F
| 511130 ||  || — || November 25, 2013 || Haleakala || Pan-STARRS || centaur || align=right | 45 km || 
|-id=131 bgcolor=#fefefe
| 511131 ||  || — || October 17, 2009 || Mount Lemmon || Mount Lemmon Survey ||  || align=right data-sort-value="0.86" | 860 m || 
|-id=132 bgcolor=#fefefe
| 511132 ||  || — || December 13, 2006 || Kitt Peak || Spacewatch ||  || align=right data-sort-value="0.72" | 720 m || 
|-id=133 bgcolor=#E9E9E9
| 511133 ||  || — || June 3, 2011 || Mount Lemmon || Mount Lemmon Survey ||  || align=right | 2.4 km || 
|-id=134 bgcolor=#E9E9E9
| 511134 ||  || — || November 16, 2009 || Kitt Peak || Spacewatch ||  || align=right data-sort-value="0.57" | 570 m || 
|-id=135 bgcolor=#E9E9E9
| 511135 ||  || — || January 25, 2010 || WISE || WISE ||  || align=right | 1.9 km || 
|-id=136 bgcolor=#E9E9E9
| 511136 ||  || — || January 9, 2010 || Mount Lemmon || Mount Lemmon Survey ||  || align=right | 1.5 km || 
|-id=137 bgcolor=#FFC2E0
| 511137 ||  || — || December 13, 2013 || Mount Lemmon || Mount Lemmon Survey || APOcritical || align=right data-sort-value="0.56" | 560 m || 
|-id=138 bgcolor=#E9E9E9
| 511138 ||  || — || February 19, 2010 || Mount Lemmon || Mount Lemmon Survey ||  || align=right data-sort-value="0.67" | 670 m || 
|-id=139 bgcolor=#E9E9E9
| 511139 ||  || — || December 20, 2009 || Mount Lemmon || Mount Lemmon Survey ||  || align=right data-sort-value="0.80" | 800 m || 
|-id=140 bgcolor=#FA8072
| 511140 ||  || — || April 8, 2010 || Siding Spring || SSS ||  || align=right | 1.4 km || 
|-id=141 bgcolor=#fefefe
| 511141 ||  || — || September 27, 2009 || Mount Lemmon || Mount Lemmon Survey ||  || align=right data-sort-value="0.74" | 740 m || 
|-id=142 bgcolor=#E9E9E9
| 511142 ||  || — || January 30, 2006 || Kitt Peak || Spacewatch ||  || align=right data-sort-value="0.62" | 620 m || 
|-id=143 bgcolor=#E9E9E9
| 511143 ||  || — || October 7, 2004 || Kitt Peak || Spacewatch ||  || align=right | 1.1 km || 
|-id=144 bgcolor=#E9E9E9
| 511144 ||  || — || April 28, 2003 || Kitt Peak || Spacewatch ||  || align=right | 1.8 km || 
|-id=145 bgcolor=#E9E9E9
| 511145 ||  || — || March 31, 2005 || Socorro || LINEAR ||  || align=right | 2.1 km || 
|-id=146 bgcolor=#E9E9E9
| 511146 ||  || — || December 10, 2013 || Mount Lemmon || Mount Lemmon Survey ||  || align=right | 1.2 km || 
|-id=147 bgcolor=#E9E9E9
| 511147 ||  || — || January 22, 2006 || Anderson Mesa || LONEOS ||  || align=right data-sort-value="0.91" | 910 m || 
|-id=148 bgcolor=#E9E9E9
| 511148 ||  || — || January 8, 2006 || Mount Lemmon || Mount Lemmon Survey ||  || align=right data-sort-value="0.78" | 780 m || 
|-id=149 bgcolor=#E9E9E9
| 511149 ||  || — || December 10, 2013 || Mount Lemmon || Mount Lemmon Survey || MAR || align=right data-sort-value="0.88" | 880 m || 
|-id=150 bgcolor=#E9E9E9
| 511150 ||  || — || January 5, 2006 || Mount Lemmon || Mount Lemmon Survey ||  || align=right data-sort-value="0.92" | 920 m || 
|-id=151 bgcolor=#fefefe
| 511151 ||  || — || October 28, 2006 || Mount Lemmon || Mount Lemmon Survey ||  || align=right data-sort-value="0.65" | 650 m || 
|-id=152 bgcolor=#E9E9E9
| 511152 ||  || — || December 25, 2013 || Mount Lemmon || Mount Lemmon Survey ||  || align=right | 1.4 km || 
|-id=153 bgcolor=#E9E9E9
| 511153 ||  || — || February 13, 2010 || Mount Lemmon || Mount Lemmon Survey ||  || align=right data-sort-value="0.93" | 930 m || 
|-id=154 bgcolor=#E9E9E9
| 511154 ||  || — || June 7, 2010 || WISE || WISE ||  || align=right | 1.7 km || 
|-id=155 bgcolor=#E9E9E9
| 511155 ||  || — || October 6, 2012 || Haleakala || Pan-STARRS ||  || align=right | 2.7 km || 
|-id=156 bgcolor=#E9E9E9
| 511156 ||  || — || December 24, 2013 || Mount Lemmon || Mount Lemmon Survey ||  || align=right | 1.6 km || 
|-id=157 bgcolor=#E9E9E9
| 511157 ||  || — || February 14, 2010 || Mount Lemmon || Mount Lemmon Survey ||  || align=right data-sort-value="0.85" | 850 m || 
|-id=158 bgcolor=#fefefe
| 511158 ||  || — || January 11, 2003 || Kitt Peak || Spacewatch ||  || align=right data-sort-value="0.62" | 620 m || 
|-id=159 bgcolor=#fefefe
| 511159 ||  || — || March 12, 2011 || Mount Lemmon || Mount Lemmon Survey ||  || align=right data-sort-value="0.77" | 770 m || 
|-id=160 bgcolor=#E9E9E9
| 511160 ||  || — || November 27, 2013 || Haleakala || Pan-STARRS ||  || align=right data-sort-value="0.76" | 760 m || 
|-id=161 bgcolor=#fefefe
| 511161 ||  || — || March 10, 2007 || Mount Lemmon || Mount Lemmon Survey || NYS || align=right data-sort-value="0.60" | 600 m || 
|-id=162 bgcolor=#E9E9E9
| 511162 ||  || — || August 2, 2008 || Siding Spring || SSS ||  || align=right | 1.2 km || 
|-id=163 bgcolor=#E9E9E9
| 511163 ||  || — || November 16, 2009 || Mount Lemmon || Mount Lemmon Survey ||  || align=right | 1.0 km || 
|-id=164 bgcolor=#E9E9E9
| 511164 ||  || — || January 23, 2006 || Kitt Peak || Spacewatch || KON || align=right | 2.2 km || 
|-id=165 bgcolor=#E9E9E9
| 511165 ||  || — || December 4, 2013 || Haleakala || Pan-STARRS ||  || align=right | 1.1 km || 
|-id=166 bgcolor=#E9E9E9
| 511166 ||  || — || December 24, 2013 || Mount Lemmon || Mount Lemmon Survey ||  || align=right | 1.4 km || 
|-id=167 bgcolor=#E9E9E9
| 511167 ||  || — || November 8, 2013 || Mount Lemmon || Mount Lemmon Survey ||  || align=right | 1.2 km || 
|-id=168 bgcolor=#fefefe
| 511168 ||  || — || March 28, 2011 || Mount Lemmon || Mount Lemmon Survey ||  || align=right data-sort-value="0.69" | 690 m || 
|-id=169 bgcolor=#E9E9E9
| 511169 ||  || — || September 5, 2008 || Kitt Peak || Spacewatch ||  || align=right | 1.6 km || 
|-id=170 bgcolor=#fefefe
| 511170 ||  || — || January 5, 2006 || Mount Lemmon || Mount Lemmon Survey ||  || align=right data-sort-value="0.77" | 770 m || 
|-id=171 bgcolor=#E9E9E9
| 511171 ||  || — || June 5, 2010 || WISE || WISE || ADE || align=right | 3.3 km || 
|-id=172 bgcolor=#E9E9E9
| 511172 ||  || — || February 21, 2006 || Catalina || CSS ||  || align=right data-sort-value="0.98" | 980 m || 
|-id=173 bgcolor=#E9E9E9
| 511173 ||  || — || February 3, 2001 || Kitt Peak || Spacewatch ||  || align=right | 1.1 km || 
|-id=174 bgcolor=#fefefe
| 511174 ||  || — || April 11, 2007 || Catalina || CSS ||  || align=right | 1.1 km || 
|-id=175 bgcolor=#fefefe
| 511175 ||  || — || March 5, 2010 || WISE || WISE ||  || align=right | 1.9 km || 
|-id=176 bgcolor=#E9E9E9
| 511176 ||  || — || October 9, 2008 || Mount Lemmon || Mount Lemmon Survey ||  || align=right | 1.1 km || 
|-id=177 bgcolor=#E9E9E9
| 511177 ||  || — || January 12, 2010 || Catalina || CSS ||  || align=right | 1.7 km || 
|-id=178 bgcolor=#E9E9E9
| 511178 ||  || — || December 18, 2004 || Mount Lemmon || Mount Lemmon Survey ||  || align=right | 1.9 km || 
|-id=179 bgcolor=#fefefe
| 511179 ||  || — || August 26, 2012 || Haleakala || Pan-STARRS ||  || align=right data-sort-value="0.89" | 890 m || 
|-id=180 bgcolor=#E9E9E9
| 511180 ||  || — || December 14, 2013 || Mount Lemmon || Mount Lemmon Survey ||  || align=right data-sort-value="0.89" | 890 m || 
|-id=181 bgcolor=#E9E9E9
| 511181 ||  || — || January 27, 2006 || Kitt Peak || Spacewatch ||  || align=right data-sort-value="0.82" | 820 m || 
|-id=182 bgcolor=#fefefe
| 511182 ||  || — || December 25, 2013 || Mount Lemmon || Mount Lemmon Survey ||  || align=right data-sort-value="0.76" | 760 m || 
|-id=183 bgcolor=#E9E9E9
| 511183 ||  || — || October 7, 2012 || Haleakala || Pan-STARRS || HNS || align=right | 1.2 km || 
|-id=184 bgcolor=#fefefe
| 511184 ||  || — || October 21, 2009 || Mount Lemmon || Mount Lemmon Survey ||  || align=right data-sort-value="0.62" | 620 m || 
|-id=185 bgcolor=#E9E9E9
| 511185 ||  || — || December 6, 2013 || Haleakala || Pan-STARRS || EUN || align=right | 1.2 km || 
|-id=186 bgcolor=#E9E9E9
| 511186 ||  || — || December 25, 2013 || Mount Lemmon || Mount Lemmon Survey ||  || align=right | 1.7 km || 
|-id=187 bgcolor=#E9E9E9
| 511187 ||  || — || December 25, 2013 || Kitt Peak || Spacewatch ||  || align=right data-sort-value="0.76" | 760 m || 
|-id=188 bgcolor=#fefefe
| 511188 ||  || — || December 31, 2013 || Haleakala || Pan-STARRS ||  || align=right data-sort-value="0.74" | 740 m || 
|-id=189 bgcolor=#E9E9E9
| 511189 ||  || — || December 28, 2013 || Kitt Peak || Spacewatch || EUN || align=right | 1.2 km || 
|-id=190 bgcolor=#E9E9E9
| 511190 ||  || — || December 25, 2005 || Mount Lemmon || Mount Lemmon Survey ||  || align=right data-sort-value="0.83" | 830 m || 
|-id=191 bgcolor=#E9E9E9
| 511191 ||  || — || February 14, 2010 || Mount Lemmon || Mount Lemmon Survey ||  || align=right data-sort-value="0.72" | 720 m || 
|-id=192 bgcolor=#fefefe
| 511192 ||  || — || March 24, 2003 || Kitt Peak || Spacewatch ||  || align=right data-sort-value="0.73" | 730 m || 
|-id=193 bgcolor=#E9E9E9
| 511193 ||  || — || October 26, 2008 || Catalina || CSS ||  || align=right | 1.9 km || 
|-id=194 bgcolor=#E9E9E9
| 511194 ||  || — || November 4, 2004 || Kitt Peak || Spacewatch ||  || align=right data-sort-value="0.95" | 950 m || 
|-id=195 bgcolor=#E9E9E9
| 511195 ||  || — || December 30, 2013 || Kitt Peak || Spacewatch ||  || align=right | 1.1 km || 
|-id=196 bgcolor=#E9E9E9
| 511196 ||  || — || November 28, 2013 || Mount Lemmon || Mount Lemmon Survey ||  || align=right | 1.5 km || 
|-id=197 bgcolor=#E9E9E9
| 511197 ||  || — || August 24, 2012 || Kitt Peak || Spacewatch ||  || align=right | 1.7 km || 
|-id=198 bgcolor=#E9E9E9
| 511198 ||  || — || January 6, 2010 || Kitt Peak || Spacewatch ||  || align=right data-sort-value="0.83" | 830 m || 
|-id=199 bgcolor=#E9E9E9
| 511199 ||  || — || December 9, 2004 || Kitt Peak || Spacewatch ||  || align=right | 1.0 km || 
|-id=200 bgcolor=#E9E9E9
| 511200 ||  || — || December 15, 2004 || Kitt Peak || Spacewatch ||  || align=right | 1.2 km || 
|}

511201–511300 

|-bgcolor=#E9E9E9
| 511201 ||  || — || December 6, 2013 || Haleakala || Pan-STARRS ||  || align=right | 1.1 km || 
|-id=202 bgcolor=#E9E9E9
| 511202 ||  || — || December 13, 2013 || Mount Lemmon || Mount Lemmon Survey ||  || align=right | 1.4 km || 
|-id=203 bgcolor=#fefefe
| 511203 ||  || — || November 17, 2009 || Mount Lemmon || Mount Lemmon Survey ||  || align=right data-sort-value="0.83" | 830 m || 
|-id=204 bgcolor=#E9E9E9
| 511204 ||  || — || February 14, 2010 || Mount Lemmon || Mount Lemmon Survey ||  || align=right | 1.1 km || 
|-id=205 bgcolor=#E9E9E9
| 511205 ||  || — || October 1, 2013 || Mount Lemmon || Mount Lemmon Survey ||  || align=right | 1.2 km || 
|-id=206 bgcolor=#E9E9E9
| 511206 ||  || — || January 5, 2006 || Mount Lemmon || Mount Lemmon Survey ||  || align=right | 1.0 km || 
|-id=207 bgcolor=#E9E9E9
| 511207 ||  || — || January 1, 2014 || Haleakala || Pan-STARRS ||  || align=right | 1.9 km || 
|-id=208 bgcolor=#E9E9E9
| 511208 ||  || — || May 26, 2011 || Mount Lemmon || Mount Lemmon Survey ||  || align=right | 1.4 km || 
|-id=209 bgcolor=#E9E9E9
| 511209 ||  || — || January 1, 2014 || Haleakala || Pan-STARRS ||  || align=right data-sort-value="0.98" | 980 m || 
|-id=210 bgcolor=#E9E9E9
| 511210 ||  || — || January 1, 2014 || Kitt Peak || Spacewatch || EUN || align=right | 1.00 km || 
|-id=211 bgcolor=#E9E9E9
| 511211 ||  || — || August 4, 2012 || Haleakala || Pan-STARRS ||  || align=right data-sort-value="0.92" | 920 m || 
|-id=212 bgcolor=#fefefe
| 511212 ||  || — || January 3, 2014 || Kitt Peak || Spacewatch ||  || align=right data-sort-value="0.72" | 720 m || 
|-id=213 bgcolor=#E9E9E9
| 511213 ||  || — || February 15, 2010 || Mount Lemmon || Mount Lemmon Survey ||  || align=right data-sort-value="0.86" | 860 m || 
|-id=214 bgcolor=#fefefe
| 511214 ||  || — || December 13, 2013 || Mount Lemmon || Mount Lemmon Survey ||  || align=right data-sort-value="0.89" | 890 m || 
|-id=215 bgcolor=#fefefe
| 511215 ||  || — || December 8, 2005 || Kitt Peak || Spacewatch ||  || align=right data-sort-value="0.78" | 780 m || 
|-id=216 bgcolor=#E9E9E9
| 511216 ||  || — || February 9, 2010 || Kitt Peak || Spacewatch ||  || align=right | 1.3 km || 
|-id=217 bgcolor=#E9E9E9
| 511217 ||  || — || December 26, 2013 || Kitt Peak || Spacewatch ||  || align=right data-sort-value="0.78" | 780 m || 
|-id=218 bgcolor=#E9E9E9
| 511218 ||  || — || October 6, 2012 || Haleakala || Pan-STARRS ||  || align=right | 1.7 km || 
|-id=219 bgcolor=#E9E9E9
| 511219 ||  || — || October 8, 2012 || Haleakala || Pan-STARRS ||  || align=right | 1.4 km || 
|-id=220 bgcolor=#E9E9E9
| 511220 ||  || — || October 6, 2012 || Mount Lemmon || Mount Lemmon Survey ||  || align=right | 2.2 km || 
|-id=221 bgcolor=#E9E9E9
| 511221 ||  || — || January 12, 2010 || Mount Lemmon || Mount Lemmon Survey ||  || align=right data-sort-value="0.76" | 760 m || 
|-id=222 bgcolor=#E9E9E9
| 511222 ||  || — || September 6, 2008 || Kitt Peak || Spacewatch ||  || align=right data-sort-value="0.95" | 950 m || 
|-id=223 bgcolor=#E9E9E9
| 511223 ||  || — || October 8, 2004 || Anderson Mesa || LONEOS ||  || align=right | 1.1 km || 
|-id=224 bgcolor=#E9E9E9
| 511224 ||  || — || March 4, 2006 || Catalina || CSS ||  || align=right data-sort-value="0.87" | 870 m || 
|-id=225 bgcolor=#E9E9E9
| 511225 ||  || — || December 31, 2013 || Kitt Peak || Spacewatch ||  || align=right | 1.4 km || 
|-id=226 bgcolor=#E9E9E9
| 511226 ||  || — || February 14, 2010 || Catalina || CSS ||  || align=right | 1.6 km || 
|-id=227 bgcolor=#fefefe
| 511227 ||  || — || March 16, 2007 || Mount Lemmon || Mount Lemmon Survey ||  || align=right data-sort-value="0.86" | 860 m || 
|-id=228 bgcolor=#E9E9E9
| 511228 ||  || — || January 11, 2010 || Kitt Peak || Spacewatch ||  || align=right | 1.1 km || 
|-id=229 bgcolor=#E9E9E9
| 511229 ||  || — || May 26, 2010 || WISE || WISE || KON || align=right | 2.0 km || 
|-id=230 bgcolor=#E9E9E9
| 511230 ||  || — || April 26, 2010 || Mount Lemmon || Mount Lemmon Survey || (40134) || align=right | 2.4 km || 
|-id=231 bgcolor=#E9E9E9
| 511231 ||  || — || December 19, 2009 || Mount Lemmon || Mount Lemmon Survey ||  || align=right data-sort-value="0.81" | 810 m || 
|-id=232 bgcolor=#E9E9E9
| 511232 ||  || — || June 26, 2010 || WISE || WISE ||  || align=right | 2.0 km || 
|-id=233 bgcolor=#E9E9E9
| 511233 ||  || — || January 11, 2010 || Kitt Peak || Spacewatch ||  || align=right | 1.0 km || 
|-id=234 bgcolor=#E9E9E9
| 511234 ||  || — || September 24, 2008 || Mount Lemmon || Mount Lemmon Survey ||  || align=right | 1.3 km || 
|-id=235 bgcolor=#E9E9E9
| 511235 ||  || — || March 11, 2005 || Mount Lemmon || Mount Lemmon Survey ||  || align=right | 1.8 km || 
|-id=236 bgcolor=#E9E9E9
| 511236 ||  || — || February 7, 2002 || Socorro || LINEAR ||  || align=right | 2.0 km || 
|-id=237 bgcolor=#E9E9E9
| 511237 ||  || — || September 22, 2008 || Catalina || CSS || EUN || align=right | 1.4 km || 
|-id=238 bgcolor=#E9E9E9
| 511238 Cuixiangqun ||  ||  || November 27, 2013 || XuYi || PMO NEO ||  || align=right | 2.3 km || 
|-id=239 bgcolor=#E9E9E9
| 511239 ||  || — || December 30, 2013 || Mount Lemmon || Mount Lemmon Survey ||  || align=right | 1.5 km || 
|-id=240 bgcolor=#E9E9E9
| 511240 ||  || — || October 26, 2012 || Haleakala || Pan-STARRS ||  || align=right | 2.1 km || 
|-id=241 bgcolor=#E9E9E9
| 511241 ||  || — || May 27, 2010 || WISE || WISE ||  || align=right | 1.7 km || 
|-id=242 bgcolor=#E9E9E9
| 511242 ||  || — || October 8, 2008 || Kitt Peak || Spacewatch ||  || align=right data-sort-value="0.80" | 800 m || 
|-id=243 bgcolor=#FFC2E0
| 511243 ||  || — || March 20, 2010 || WISE || WISE || AMO || align=right | 1.2 km || 
|-id=244 bgcolor=#E9E9E9
| 511244 ||  || — || December 11, 2013 || Mount Lemmon || Mount Lemmon Survey ||  || align=right data-sort-value="0.92" | 920 m || 
|-id=245 bgcolor=#E9E9E9
| 511245 ||  || — || October 1, 2008 || Mount Lemmon || Mount Lemmon Survey ||  || align=right | 1.3 km || 
|-id=246 bgcolor=#E9E9E9
| 511246 ||  || — || October 22, 2008 || Mount Lemmon || Mount Lemmon Survey ||  || align=right | 1.2 km || 
|-id=247 bgcolor=#E9E9E9
| 511247 ||  || — || February 17, 2010 || Kitt Peak || Spacewatch ||  || align=right | 1.1 km || 
|-id=248 bgcolor=#E9E9E9
| 511248 ||  || — || January 23, 2014 || Mount Lemmon || Mount Lemmon Survey ||  || align=right | 1.9 km || 
|-id=249 bgcolor=#E9E9E9
| 511249 ||  || — || April 8, 2006 || Mount Lemmon || Mount Lemmon Survey ||  || align=right data-sort-value="0.91" | 910 m || 
|-id=250 bgcolor=#E9E9E9
| 511250 ||  || — || February 13, 2010 || Kitt Peak || Spacewatch ||  || align=right data-sort-value="0.79" | 790 m || 
|-id=251 bgcolor=#E9E9E9
| 511251 ||  || — || January 15, 2010 || Mount Lemmon || Mount Lemmon Survey ||  || align=right | 1.7 km || 
|-id=252 bgcolor=#d6d6d6
| 511252 ||  || — || January 23, 2014 || Mount Lemmon || Mount Lemmon Survey ||  || align=right | 2.2 km || 
|-id=253 bgcolor=#E9E9E9
| 511253 ||  || — || September 23, 2008 || Kitt Peak || Spacewatch ||  || align=right data-sort-value="0.81" | 810 m || 
|-id=254 bgcolor=#E9E9E9
| 511254 ||  || — || January 11, 2010 || Kitt Peak || Spacewatch || EUN || align=right data-sort-value="0.92" | 920 m || 
|-id=255 bgcolor=#E9E9E9
| 511255 ||  || — || October 8, 2012 || Haleakala || Pan-STARRS ||  || align=right | 1.3 km || 
|-id=256 bgcolor=#E9E9E9
| 511256 ||  || — || January 2, 2014 || Kitt Peak || Spacewatch ||  || align=right | 1.6 km || 
|-id=257 bgcolor=#E9E9E9
| 511257 ||  || — || December 30, 2008 || Kitt Peak || Spacewatch ||  || align=right | 2.1 km || 
|-id=258 bgcolor=#E9E9E9
| 511258 ||  || — || February 27, 2006 || Mount Lemmon || Mount Lemmon Survey ||  || align=right data-sort-value="0.87" | 870 m || 
|-id=259 bgcolor=#E9E9E9
| 511259 ||  || — || June 22, 2010 || WISE || WISE || ADE || align=right | 1.7 km || 
|-id=260 bgcolor=#fefefe
| 511260 ||  || — || December 31, 2013 || Kitt Peak || Spacewatch ||  || align=right data-sort-value="0.72" | 720 m || 
|-id=261 bgcolor=#E9E9E9
| 511261 ||  || — || February 6, 2014 || Mount Lemmon || Mount Lemmon Survey ||  || align=right | 1.4 km || 
|-id=262 bgcolor=#E9E9E9
| 511262 ||  || — || March 12, 2010 || Mount Lemmon || Mount Lemmon Survey ||  || align=right | 1.1 km || 
|-id=263 bgcolor=#E9E9E9
| 511263 ||  || — || October 8, 2012 || Haleakala || Pan-STARRS ||  || align=right | 1.6 km || 
|-id=264 bgcolor=#E9E9E9
| 511264 ||  || — || February 9, 2014 || Haleakala || Pan-STARRS ||  || align=right | 1.4 km || 
|-id=265 bgcolor=#E9E9E9
| 511265 ||  || — || March 20, 2010 || Kitt Peak || Spacewatch ||  || align=right | 1.3 km || 
|-id=266 bgcolor=#d6d6d6
| 511266 ||  || — || March 26, 2010 || WISE || WISE ||  || align=right | 3.6 km || 
|-id=267 bgcolor=#E9E9E9
| 511267 ||  || — || January 29, 2014 || Kitt Peak || Spacewatch ||  || align=right | 1.0 km || 
|-id=268 bgcolor=#d6d6d6
| 511268 ||  || — || September 24, 2011 || Mount Lemmon || Mount Lemmon Survey ||  || align=right | 2.7 km || 
|-id=269 bgcolor=#E9E9E9
| 511269 ||  || — || September 24, 2008 || Mount Lemmon || Mount Lemmon Survey ||  || align=right data-sort-value="0.99" | 990 m || 
|-id=270 bgcolor=#E9E9E9
| 511270 ||  || — || March 23, 2006 || Mount Lemmon || Mount Lemmon Survey ||  || align=right data-sort-value="0.74" | 740 m || 
|-id=271 bgcolor=#E9E9E9
| 511271 ||  || — || January 3, 2014 || Mount Lemmon || Mount Lemmon Survey ||  || align=right data-sort-value="0.83" | 830 m || 
|-id=272 bgcolor=#E9E9E9
| 511272 ||  || — || April 7, 2010 || Kitt Peak || Spacewatch ||  || align=right | 1.9 km || 
|-id=273 bgcolor=#E9E9E9
| 511273 ||  || — || November 9, 2008 || Kitt Peak || Spacewatch || BRG || align=right | 1.3 km || 
|-id=274 bgcolor=#E9E9E9
| 511274 ||  || — || December 4, 2008 || Kitt Peak || Spacewatch ||  || align=right | 1.8 km || 
|-id=275 bgcolor=#E9E9E9
| 511275 ||  || — || October 8, 2007 || Mount Lemmon || Mount Lemmon Survey ||  || align=right | 1.5 km || 
|-id=276 bgcolor=#E9E9E9
| 511276 ||  || — || August 27, 2011 || Haleakala || Pan-STARRS ||  || align=right | 2.0 km || 
|-id=277 bgcolor=#E9E9E9
| 511277 ||  || — || August 27, 2011 || Haleakala || Pan-STARRS ||  || align=right | 2.8 km || 
|-id=278 bgcolor=#d6d6d6
| 511278 ||  || — || January 1, 2009 || Kitt Peak || Spacewatch ||  || align=right | 2.2 km || 
|-id=279 bgcolor=#E9E9E9
| 511279 ||  || — || March 10, 2005 || Mount Lemmon || Mount Lemmon Survey ||  || align=right | 1.7 km || 
|-id=280 bgcolor=#E9E9E9
| 511280 ||  || — || February 10, 2014 || Haleakala || Pan-STARRS ||  || align=right | 1.7 km || 
|-id=281 bgcolor=#E9E9E9
| 511281 ||  || — || October 21, 2007 || Kitt Peak || Spacewatch ||  || align=right | 2.0 km || 
|-id=282 bgcolor=#E9E9E9
| 511282 ||  || — || October 27, 2008 || Kitt Peak || Spacewatch ||  || align=right | 1.2 km || 
|-id=283 bgcolor=#d6d6d6
| 511283 ||  || — || February 23, 2003 || Kitt Peak || Spacewatch || TIR || align=right | 2.7 km || 
|-id=284 bgcolor=#E9E9E9
| 511284 ||  || — || March 18, 2010 || Mount Lemmon || Mount Lemmon Survey ||  || align=right | 1.4 km || 
|-id=285 bgcolor=#d6d6d6
| 511285 ||  || — || February 25, 2014 || Kitt Peak || Spacewatch ||  || align=right | 2.5 km || 
|-id=286 bgcolor=#E9E9E9
| 511286 ||  || — || November 17, 2007 || Kitt Peak || Spacewatch || AGN || align=right | 1.1 km || 
|-id=287 bgcolor=#E9E9E9
| 511287 ||  || — || September 13, 2007 || Kitt Peak || Spacewatch ||  || align=right | 2.4 km || 
|-id=288 bgcolor=#E9E9E9
| 511288 ||  || — || February 10, 2014 || Haleakala || Pan-STARRS ||  || align=right | 2.0 km || 
|-id=289 bgcolor=#E9E9E9
| 511289 ||  || — || September 3, 2008 || Kitt Peak || Spacewatch ||  || align=right | 1.0 km || 
|-id=290 bgcolor=#E9E9E9
| 511290 ||  || — || October 9, 2012 || Haleakala || Pan-STARRS || JUN || align=right data-sort-value="0.76" | 760 m || 
|-id=291 bgcolor=#E9E9E9
| 511291 ||  || — || May 24, 2006 || Kitt Peak || Spacewatch || BRG || align=right | 1.3 km || 
|-id=292 bgcolor=#E9E9E9
| 511292 ||  || — || February 26, 2014 || Haleakala || Pan-STARRS ||  || align=right | 1.8 km || 
|-id=293 bgcolor=#E9E9E9
| 511293 ||  || — || September 14, 2007 || Mount Lemmon || Mount Lemmon Survey ||  || align=right | 1.8 km || 
|-id=294 bgcolor=#E9E9E9
| 511294 ||  || — || January 27, 2010 || WISE || WISE ||  || align=right | 1.6 km || 
|-id=295 bgcolor=#E9E9E9
| 511295 ||  || — || October 6, 2012 || Haleakala || Pan-STARRS ||  || align=right data-sort-value="0.87" | 870 m || 
|-id=296 bgcolor=#E9E9E9
| 511296 ||  || — || February 26, 2014 || Haleakala || Pan-STARRS ||  || align=right | 1.5 km || 
|-id=297 bgcolor=#E9E9E9
| 511297 ||  || — || February 26, 2014 || Haleakala || Pan-STARRS ||  || align=right | 2.0 km || 
|-id=298 bgcolor=#d6d6d6
| 511298 ||  || — || February 26, 2014 || Haleakala || Pan-STARRS ||  || align=right | 2.0 km || 
|-id=299 bgcolor=#E9E9E9
| 511299 ||  || — || October 16, 2012 || Mount Lemmon || Mount Lemmon Survey ||  || align=right | 1.2 km || 
|-id=300 bgcolor=#E9E9E9
| 511300 ||  || — || April 9, 2010 || Kitt Peak || Spacewatch ||  || align=right | 1.00 km || 
|}

511301–511400 

|-bgcolor=#E9E9E9
| 511301 ||  || — || October 18, 2011 || Haleakala || Pan-STARRS ||  || align=right | 2.8 km || 
|-id=302 bgcolor=#E9E9E9
| 511302 ||  || — || February 27, 2001 || Kitt Peak || Spacewatch ||  || align=right | 1.4 km || 
|-id=303 bgcolor=#E9E9E9
| 511303 ||  || — || December 31, 2008 || Kitt Peak || Spacewatch ||  || align=right | 1.7 km || 
|-id=304 bgcolor=#E9E9E9
| 511304 ||  || — || October 17, 2012 || Haleakala || Pan-STARRS || MRX || align=right | 1.0 km || 
|-id=305 bgcolor=#E9E9E9
| 511305 ||  || — || February 25, 2014 || Kitt Peak || Spacewatch ||  || align=right | 1.8 km || 
|-id=306 bgcolor=#E9E9E9
| 511306 ||  || — || October 17, 2012 || Mount Lemmon || Mount Lemmon Survey ||  || align=right | 1.5 km || 
|-id=307 bgcolor=#E9E9E9
| 511307 ||  || — || December 30, 2008 || Kitt Peak || Spacewatch || AEO || align=right | 1.1 km || 
|-id=308 bgcolor=#E9E9E9
| 511308 ||  || — || February 10, 2014 || Haleakala || Pan-STARRS ||  || align=right | 2.7 km || 
|-id=309 bgcolor=#E9E9E9
| 511309 ||  || — || October 20, 2012 || Haleakala || Pan-STARRS || EUN || align=right | 1.1 km || 
|-id=310 bgcolor=#E9E9E9
| 511310 ||  || — || September 20, 2011 || Haleakala || Pan-STARRS ||  || align=right | 1.4 km || 
|-id=311 bgcolor=#E9E9E9
| 511311 ||  || — || October 12, 2007 || Kitt Peak || Spacewatch ||  || align=right | 2.0 km || 
|-id=312 bgcolor=#E9E9E9
| 511312 ||  || — || September 24, 2011 || Haleakala || Pan-STARRS ||  || align=right | 2.2 km || 
|-id=313 bgcolor=#d6d6d6
| 511313 ||  || — || September 23, 2011 || Haleakala || Pan-STARRS ||  || align=right | 2.8 km || 
|-id=314 bgcolor=#E9E9E9
| 511314 ||  || — || December 29, 2000 || Kitt Peak || Spacewatch ||  || align=right data-sort-value="0.99" | 990 m || 
|-id=315 bgcolor=#E9E9E9
| 511315 ||  || — || October 19, 2012 || Haleakala || Pan-STARRS ||  || align=right | 1.3 km || 
|-id=316 bgcolor=#E9E9E9
| 511316 ||  || — || October 1, 2008 || Kitt Peak || Spacewatch ||  || align=right | 1.1 km || 
|-id=317 bgcolor=#E9E9E9
| 511317 ||  || — || October 18, 2012 || Haleakala || Pan-STARRS ||  || align=right | 1.5 km || 
|-id=318 bgcolor=#E9E9E9
| 511318 ||  || — || October 6, 2012 || Haleakala || Pan-STARRS ||  || align=right | 1.5 km || 
|-id=319 bgcolor=#E9E9E9
| 511319 ||  || — || January 2, 2014 || Mount Lemmon || Mount Lemmon Survey ||  || align=right | 2.2 km || 
|-id=320 bgcolor=#E9E9E9
| 511320 ||  || — || October 21, 2012 || Haleakala || Pan-STARRS || MRX || align=right | 1.2 km || 
|-id=321 bgcolor=#E9E9E9
| 511321 ||  || — || July 26, 2011 || Haleakala || Pan-STARRS ||  || align=right data-sort-value="0.98" | 980 m || 
|-id=322 bgcolor=#E9E9E9
| 511322 ||  || — || March 11, 2005 || Kitt Peak || Spacewatch ||  || align=right | 2.0 km || 
|-id=323 bgcolor=#E9E9E9
| 511323 ||  || — || October 21, 2012 || Haleakala || Pan-STARRS ||  || align=right | 1.3 km || 
|-id=324 bgcolor=#E9E9E9
| 511324 ||  || — || February 1, 2005 || Kitt Peak || Spacewatch ||  || align=right | 1.1 km || 
|-id=325 bgcolor=#d6d6d6
| 511325 ||  || — || February 24, 2009 || Mount Lemmon || Mount Lemmon Survey ||  || align=right | 2.0 km || 
|-id=326 bgcolor=#E9E9E9
| 511326 ||  || — || April 30, 2006 || Kitt Peak || Spacewatch ||  || align=right | 1.1 km || 
|-id=327 bgcolor=#E9E9E9
| 511327 ||  || — || December 11, 2004 || Catalina || CSS ||  || align=right | 1.5 km || 
|-id=328 bgcolor=#d6d6d6
| 511328 ||  || — || February 13, 2008 || Kitt Peak || Spacewatch ||  || align=right | 2.5 km || 
|-id=329 bgcolor=#d6d6d6
| 511329 ||  || — || February 28, 2014 || Haleakala || Pan-STARRS ||  || align=right | 3.1 km || 
|-id=330 bgcolor=#d6d6d6
| 511330 ||  || — || March 18, 2009 || Mount Lemmon || Mount Lemmon Survey ||  || align=right | 2.9 km || 
|-id=331 bgcolor=#E9E9E9
| 511331 ||  || — || July 27, 2011 || Haleakala || Pan-STARRS ||  || align=right | 1.1 km || 
|-id=332 bgcolor=#d6d6d6
| 511332 ||  || — || January 29, 2014 || Mount Lemmon || Mount Lemmon Survey ||  || align=right | 2.4 km || 
|-id=333 bgcolor=#E9E9E9
| 511333 ||  || — || December 13, 2013 || Mount Lemmon || Mount Lemmon Survey ||  || align=right data-sort-value="0.97" | 970 m || 
|-id=334 bgcolor=#E9E9E9
| 511334 ||  || — || August 25, 2012 || Haleakala || Pan-STARRS ||  || align=right | 1.4 km || 
|-id=335 bgcolor=#d6d6d6
| 511335 ||  || — || February 9, 2014 || Haleakala || Pan-STARRS ||  || align=right | 2.7 km || 
|-id=336 bgcolor=#E9E9E9
| 511336 ||  || — || October 2, 2008 || Kitt Peak || Spacewatch ||  || align=right data-sort-value="0.77" | 770 m || 
|-id=337 bgcolor=#E9E9E9
| 511337 ||  || — || September 21, 2012 || Mount Lemmon || Mount Lemmon Survey ||  || align=right | 1.1 km || 
|-id=338 bgcolor=#E9E9E9
| 511338 ||  || — || October 4, 2007 || Kitt Peak || Spacewatch ||  || align=right | 2.1 km || 
|-id=339 bgcolor=#E9E9E9
| 511339 ||  || — || April 8, 2010 || Mount Lemmon || Mount Lemmon Survey ||  || align=right data-sort-value="0.68" | 680 m || 
|-id=340 bgcolor=#E9E9E9
| 511340 ||  || — || February 10, 2014 || Haleakala || Pan-STARRS ||  || align=right | 1.7 km || 
|-id=341 bgcolor=#E9E9E9
| 511341 ||  || — || November 24, 2008 || Mount Lemmon || Mount Lemmon Survey ||  || align=right | 2.1 km || 
|-id=342 bgcolor=#d6d6d6
| 511342 ||  || — || January 15, 2009 || Kitt Peak || Spacewatch ||  || align=right | 1.6 km || 
|-id=343 bgcolor=#E9E9E9
| 511343 ||  || — || October 6, 2012 || Haleakala || Pan-STARRS ||  || align=right | 1.7 km || 
|-id=344 bgcolor=#d6d6d6
| 511344 ||  || — || February 9, 2008 || Mount Lemmon || Mount Lemmon Survey ||  || align=right | 2.9 km || 
|-id=345 bgcolor=#d6d6d6
| 511345 ||  || — || February 9, 2014 || Haleakala || Pan-STARRS ||  || align=right | 2.6 km || 
|-id=346 bgcolor=#E9E9E9
| 511346 ||  || — || July 4, 2010 || WISE || WISE ||  || align=right | 2.5 km || 
|-id=347 bgcolor=#d6d6d6
| 511347 ||  || — || February 28, 2009 || Mount Lemmon || Mount Lemmon Survey ||  || align=right | 3.2 km || 
|-id=348 bgcolor=#E9E9E9
| 511348 ||  || — || January 19, 2010 || WISE || WISE || ADE || align=right | 2.1 km || 
|-id=349 bgcolor=#E9E9E9
| 511349 ||  || — || February 26, 2014 || Mount Lemmon || Mount Lemmon Survey ||  || align=right | 1.6 km || 
|-id=350 bgcolor=#fefefe
| 511350 ||  || — || October 7, 2008 || Kitt Peak || Spacewatch ||  || align=right data-sort-value="0.91" | 910 m || 
|-id=351 bgcolor=#E9E9E9
| 511351 ||  || — || February 9, 2005 || Mount Lemmon || Mount Lemmon Survey ||  || align=right | 1.5 km || 
|-id=352 bgcolor=#E9E9E9
| 511352 ||  || — || May 6, 2006 || Mount Lemmon || Mount Lemmon Survey ||  || align=right | 2.2 km || 
|-id=353 bgcolor=#d6d6d6
| 511353 ||  || — || April 27, 2009 || Kitt Peak || Spacewatch ||  || align=right | 2.4 km || 
|-id=354 bgcolor=#d6d6d6
| 511354 ||  || — || October 16, 2011 || Haleakala || Pan-STARRS || EOS || align=right | 2.1 km || 
|-id=355 bgcolor=#E9E9E9
| 511355 ||  || — || April 11, 2005 || Kitt Peak || Spacewatch ||  || align=right | 2.5 km || 
|-id=356 bgcolor=#E9E9E9
| 511356 ||  || — || February 10, 2014 || Haleakala || Pan-STARRS ||  || align=right | 1.3 km || 
|-id=357 bgcolor=#E9E9E9
| 511357 ||  || — || May 8, 2005 || Mount Lemmon || Mount Lemmon Survey ||  || align=right | 1.8 km || 
|-id=358 bgcolor=#E9E9E9
| 511358 ||  || — || September 19, 2012 || Mount Lemmon || Mount Lemmon Survey || (194) || align=right | 1.6 km || 
|-id=359 bgcolor=#E9E9E9
| 511359 ||  || — || December 10, 2004 || Socorro || LINEAR ||  || align=right | 1.2 km || 
|-id=360 bgcolor=#d6d6d6
| 511360 ||  || — || August 31, 2011 || Haleakala || Pan-STARRS || EOS || align=right | 1.9 km || 
|-id=361 bgcolor=#E9E9E9
| 511361 ||  || — || November 7, 2007 || Kitt Peak || Spacewatch ||  || align=right | 1.8 km || 
|-id=362 bgcolor=#E9E9E9
| 511362 ||  || — || March 10, 2005 || Anderson Mesa || LONEOS || JUN || align=right data-sort-value="0.99" | 990 m || 
|-id=363 bgcolor=#E9E9E9
| 511363 ||  || — || July 5, 2010 || Mount Lemmon || Mount Lemmon Survey ||  || align=right | 2.1 km || 
|-id=364 bgcolor=#E9E9E9
| 511364 ||  || — || February 24, 2010 || WISE || WISE ||  || align=right data-sort-value="0.94" | 940 m || 
|-id=365 bgcolor=#E9E9E9
| 511365 ||  || — || February 28, 2014 || Haleakala || Pan-STARRS ||  || align=right | 2.3 km || 
|-id=366 bgcolor=#E9E9E9
| 511366 ||  || — || December 10, 2012 || Haleakala || Pan-STARRS ||  || align=right | 1.8 km || 
|-id=367 bgcolor=#d6d6d6
| 511367 ||  || — || March 12, 2014 || Mount Lemmon || Mount Lemmon Survey ||  || align=right | 2.2 km || 
|-id=368 bgcolor=#E9E9E9
| 511368 ||  || — || March 9, 2014 || Haleakala || Pan-STARRS ||  || align=right | 1.5 km || 
|-id=369 bgcolor=#E9E9E9
| 511369 ||  || — || March 18, 2010 || Mount Lemmon || Mount Lemmon Survey ||  || align=right data-sort-value="0.79" | 790 m || 
|-id=370 bgcolor=#E9E9E9
| 511370 ||  || — || March 17, 2005 || Mount Lemmon || Mount Lemmon Survey ||  || align=right | 2.3 km || 
|-id=371 bgcolor=#E9E9E9
| 511371 ||  || — || November 30, 2008 || Kitt Peak || Spacewatch ||  || align=right data-sort-value="0.86" | 860 m || 
|-id=372 bgcolor=#d6d6d6
| 511372 ||  || — || September 23, 2011 || Kitt Peak || Spacewatch ||  || align=right | 2.9 km || 
|-id=373 bgcolor=#E9E9E9
| 511373 ||  || — || January 17, 2010 || WISE || WISE ||  || align=right | 2.2 km || 
|-id=374 bgcolor=#d6d6d6
| 511374 ||  || — || March 25, 2014 || Mount Lemmon || Mount Lemmon Survey ||  || align=right | 2.8 km || 
|-id=375 bgcolor=#E9E9E9
| 511375 ||  || — || March 24, 2014 || Haleakala || Pan-STARRS ||  || align=right | 1.1 km || 
|-id=376 bgcolor=#E9E9E9
| 511376 ||  || — || October 11, 2007 || Mount Lemmon || Mount Lemmon Survey ||  || align=right | 1.8 km || 
|-id=377 bgcolor=#d6d6d6
| 511377 ||  || — || June 13, 2010 || WISE || WISE ||  || align=right | 4.5 km || 
|-id=378 bgcolor=#E9E9E9
| 511378 ||  || — || April 21, 2006 || Kitt Peak || Spacewatch ||  || align=right data-sort-value="0.97" | 970 m || 
|-id=379 bgcolor=#E9E9E9
| 511379 ||  || — || March 21, 2010 || Mount Lemmon || Mount Lemmon Survey ||  || align=right | 1.2 km || 
|-id=380 bgcolor=#d6d6d6
| 511380 ||  || — || October 22, 2011 || Mount Lemmon || Mount Lemmon Survey || ARM || align=right | 3.0 km || 
|-id=381 bgcolor=#d6d6d6
| 511381 ||  || — || April 21, 2009 || Mount Lemmon || Mount Lemmon Survey ||  || align=right | 2.6 km || 
|-id=382 bgcolor=#E9E9E9
| 511382 ||  || — || February 28, 2014 || Haleakala || Pan-STARRS ||  || align=right | 1.4 km || 
|-id=383 bgcolor=#E9E9E9
| 511383 ||  || — || September 24, 2011 || Haleakala || Pan-STARRS || JUN || align=right | 1.2 km || 
|-id=384 bgcolor=#d6d6d6
| 511384 ||  || — || February 19, 2009 || Kitt Peak || Spacewatch ||  || align=right | 1.7 km || 
|-id=385 bgcolor=#d6d6d6
| 511385 ||  || — || April 4, 2014 || Haleakala || Pan-STARRS ||  || align=right | 1.7 km || 
|-id=386 bgcolor=#E9E9E9
| 511386 ||  || — || November 3, 2007 || Kitt Peak || Spacewatch ||  || align=right | 2.0 km || 
|-id=387 bgcolor=#E9E9E9
| 511387 ||  || — || December 30, 2008 || Kitt Peak || Spacewatch ||  || align=right | 1.7 km || 
|-id=388 bgcolor=#d6d6d6
| 511388 ||  || — || September 23, 2011 || Haleakala || Pan-STARRS ||  || align=right | 2.4 km || 
|-id=389 bgcolor=#d6d6d6
| 511389 ||  || — || February 27, 2009 || Catalina || CSS ||  || align=right | 3.2 km || 
|-id=390 bgcolor=#E9E9E9
| 511390 ||  || — || March 19, 2010 || Mount Lemmon || Mount Lemmon Survey ||  || align=right | 1.3 km || 
|-id=391 bgcolor=#E9E9E9
| 511391 ||  || — || November 18, 2007 || Kitt Peak || Spacewatch ||  || align=right | 2.0 km || 
|-id=392 bgcolor=#d6d6d6
| 511392 ||  || — || June 18, 1998 || Kitt Peak || Spacewatch ||  || align=right | 3.5 km || 
|-id=393 bgcolor=#C2FFFF
| 511393 ||  || — || September 19, 2008 || Kitt Peak || Spacewatch || L4 || align=right | 8.9 km || 
|-id=394 bgcolor=#d6d6d6
| 511394 ||  || — || March 7, 2003 || Anderson Mesa || LONEOS ||  || align=right | 2.1 km || 
|-id=395 bgcolor=#E9E9E9
| 511395 ||  || — || January 17, 2005 || Kitt Peak || Spacewatch ||  || align=right | 2.1 km || 
|-id=396 bgcolor=#d6d6d6
| 511396 ||  || — || December 4, 2005 || Mount Lemmon || Mount Lemmon Survey ||  || align=right | 3.4 km || 
|-id=397 bgcolor=#d6d6d6
| 511397 ||  || — || August 28, 2005 || Kitt Peak || Spacewatch ||  || align=right | 2.1 km || 
|-id=398 bgcolor=#E9E9E9
| 511398 ||  || — || December 4, 2007 || Catalina || CSS ||  || align=right | 2.8 km || 
|-id=399 bgcolor=#E9E9E9
| 511399 ||  || — || March 19, 2010 || WISE || WISE ||  || align=right | 1.4 km || 
|-id=400 bgcolor=#d6d6d6
| 511400 ||  || — || October 6, 2011 || Mount Lemmon || Mount Lemmon Survey ||  || align=right | 2.8 km || 
|}

511401–511500 

|-bgcolor=#d6d6d6
| 511401 ||  || — || October 23, 2011 || Mount Lemmon || Mount Lemmon Survey ||  || align=right | 2.4 km || 
|-id=402 bgcolor=#E9E9E9
| 511402 ||  || — || March 23, 2014 || Kitt Peak || Spacewatch ||  || align=right | 1.6 km || 
|-id=403 bgcolor=#E9E9E9
| 511403 ||  || — || March 11, 2005 || Mount Lemmon || Mount Lemmon Survey || MIS || align=right | 1.9 km || 
|-id=404 bgcolor=#d6d6d6
| 511404 ||  || — || April 21, 2014 || Mount Lemmon || Mount Lemmon Survey ||  || align=right | 2.5 km || 
|-id=405 bgcolor=#E9E9E9
| 511405 ||  || — || October 18, 2011 || Haleakala || Pan-STARRS ||  || align=right | 2.5 km || 
|-id=406 bgcolor=#d6d6d6
| 511406 ||  || — || December 21, 2012 || Mount Lemmon || Mount Lemmon Survey || KOR || align=right | 1.2 km || 
|-id=407 bgcolor=#E9E9E9
| 511407 ||  || — || March 1, 2005 || Kitt Peak || Spacewatch ||  || align=right | 1.4 km || 
|-id=408 bgcolor=#d6d6d6
| 511408 ||  || — || September 26, 2011 || Haleakala || Pan-STARRS ||  || align=right | 2.2 km || 
|-id=409 bgcolor=#d6d6d6
| 511409 ||  || — || September 30, 2011 || Kitt Peak || Spacewatch ||  || align=right | 2.6 km || 
|-id=410 bgcolor=#E9E9E9
| 511410 ||  || — || January 31, 2009 || Kitt Peak || Spacewatch ||  || align=right | 1.6 km || 
|-id=411 bgcolor=#d6d6d6
| 511411 ||  || — || September 26, 2006 || Kitt Peak || Spacewatch || KOR || align=right | 1.0 km || 
|-id=412 bgcolor=#d6d6d6
| 511412 ||  || — || June 6, 2010 || WISE || WISE || EUP || align=right | 2.6 km || 
|-id=413 bgcolor=#E9E9E9
| 511413 ||  || — || September 4, 2011 || Haleakala || Pan-STARRS ||  || align=right | 1.5 km || 
|-id=414 bgcolor=#d6d6d6
| 511414 ||  || — || April 23, 2009 || Mount Lemmon || Mount Lemmon Survey ||  || align=right | 2.1 km || 
|-id=415 bgcolor=#E9E9E9
| 511415 ||  || — || October 18, 2012 || Haleakala || Pan-STARRS ||  || align=right | 1.7 km || 
|-id=416 bgcolor=#d6d6d6
| 511416 ||  || — || April 6, 2014 || Kitt Peak || Spacewatch ||  || align=right | 2.4 km || 
|-id=417 bgcolor=#d6d6d6
| 511417 ||  || — || June 12, 2009 || Kitt Peak || Spacewatch ||  || align=right | 2.4 km || 
|-id=418 bgcolor=#d6d6d6
| 511418 ||  || — || February 28, 2014 || Haleakala || Pan-STARRS ||  || align=right | 3.8 km || 
|-id=419 bgcolor=#d6d6d6
| 511419 ||  || — || April 24, 2014 || Haleakala || Pan-STARRS ||  || align=right | 3.0 km || 
|-id=420 bgcolor=#d6d6d6
| 511420 ||  || — || December 18, 2007 || Mount Lemmon || Mount Lemmon Survey ||  || align=right | 2.3 km || 
|-id=421 bgcolor=#E9E9E9
| 511421 ||  || — || February 26, 2014 || Mount Lemmon || Mount Lemmon Survey ||  || align=right | 1.8 km || 
|-id=422 bgcolor=#E9E9E9
| 511422 ||  || — || January 2, 2009 || Kitt Peak || Spacewatch ||  || align=right | 1.7 km || 
|-id=423 bgcolor=#E9E9E9
| 511423 ||  || — || September 24, 2011 || Haleakala || Pan-STARRS || GEF || align=right | 1.4 km || 
|-id=424 bgcolor=#d6d6d6
| 511424 ||  || — || January 10, 2013 || Haleakala || Pan-STARRS ||  || align=right | 2.4 km || 
|-id=425 bgcolor=#E9E9E9
| 511425 ||  || — || September 24, 2011 || Haleakala || Pan-STARRS ||  || align=right | 2.3 km || 
|-id=426 bgcolor=#d6d6d6
| 511426 ||  || — || October 25, 2011 || Haleakala || Pan-STARRS ||  || align=right | 2.6 km || 
|-id=427 bgcolor=#d6d6d6
| 511427 ||  || — || December 23, 2012 || Haleakala || Pan-STARRS ||  || align=right | 2.7 km || 
|-id=428 bgcolor=#E9E9E9
| 511428 ||  || — || April 5, 2014 || Haleakala || Pan-STARRS || AGN || align=right data-sort-value="0.98" | 980 m || 
|-id=429 bgcolor=#E9E9E9
| 511429 ||  || — || March 12, 2014 || Kitt Peak || Spacewatch ||  || align=right | 2.2 km || 
|-id=430 bgcolor=#E9E9E9
| 511430 ||  || — || February 28, 2014 || Haleakala || Pan-STARRS ||  || align=right | 1.5 km || 
|-id=431 bgcolor=#d6d6d6
| 511431 ||  || — || April 24, 2014 || Haleakala || Pan-STARRS ||  || align=right | 3.4 km || 
|-id=432 bgcolor=#d6d6d6
| 511432 ||  || — || July 7, 2010 || WISE || WISE ||  || align=right | 4.1 km || 
|-id=433 bgcolor=#d6d6d6
| 511433 ||  || — || October 3, 2006 || Mount Lemmon || Mount Lemmon Survey ||  || align=right | 1.9 km || 
|-id=434 bgcolor=#FA8072
| 511434 ||  || — || October 31, 2005 || Catalina || CSS ||  || align=right data-sort-value="0.60" | 600 m || 
|-id=435 bgcolor=#d6d6d6
| 511435 ||  || — || March 12, 2013 || Mount Lemmon || Mount Lemmon Survey ||  || align=right | 2.4 km || 
|-id=436 bgcolor=#d6d6d6
| 511436 ||  || — || May 3, 2014 || Mount Lemmon || Mount Lemmon Survey ||  || align=right | 2.0 km || 
|-id=437 bgcolor=#d6d6d6
| 511437 ||  || — || May 29, 2009 || Mount Lemmon || Mount Lemmon Survey ||  || align=right | 2.4 km || 
|-id=438 bgcolor=#E9E9E9
| 511438 ||  || — || February 20, 2009 || Mount Lemmon || Mount Lemmon Survey ||  || align=right | 1.8 km || 
|-id=439 bgcolor=#E9E9E9
| 511439 ||  || — || October 26, 2011 || Haleakala || Pan-STARRS ||  || align=right | 2.6 km || 
|-id=440 bgcolor=#FA8072
| 511440 ||  || — || July 16, 2004 || Siding Spring || SSS || H || align=right data-sort-value="0.57" | 570 m || 
|-id=441 bgcolor=#d6d6d6
| 511441 ||  || — || February 28, 2014 || Haleakala || Pan-STARRS ||  || align=right | 2.7 km || 
|-id=442 bgcolor=#E9E9E9
| 511442 ||  || — || January 29, 2009 || Mount Lemmon || Mount Lemmon Survey ||  || align=right | 2.0 km || 
|-id=443 bgcolor=#E9E9E9
| 511443 ||  || — || February 13, 2009 || Kitt Peak || Spacewatch ||  || align=right | 2.2 km || 
|-id=444 bgcolor=#d6d6d6
| 511444 ||  || — || May 4, 2014 || Haleakala || Pan-STARRS ||  || align=right | 3.0 km || 
|-id=445 bgcolor=#E9E9E9
| 511445 ||  || — || December 12, 2012 || Mount Lemmon || Mount Lemmon Survey ||  || align=right | 1.5 km || 
|-id=446 bgcolor=#d6d6d6
| 511446 ||  || — || April 25, 2014 || Mount Lemmon || Mount Lemmon Survey ||  || align=right | 2.6 km || 
|-id=447 bgcolor=#d6d6d6
| 511447 ||  || — || April 30, 2014 || Haleakala || Pan-STARRS ||  || align=right | 2.2 km || 
|-id=448 bgcolor=#d6d6d6
| 511448 ||  || — || May 7, 2014 || Haleakala || Pan-STARRS ||  || align=right | 3.2 km || 
|-id=449 bgcolor=#E9E9E9
| 511449 ||  || — || February 1, 2009 || Mount Lemmon || Mount Lemmon Survey ||  || align=right | 2.0 km || 
|-id=450 bgcolor=#E9E9E9
| 511450 ||  || — || February 28, 2014 || Haleakala || Pan-STARRS ||  || align=right | 2.0 km || 
|-id=451 bgcolor=#d6d6d6
| 511451 ||  || — || May 8, 2014 || Haleakala || Pan-STARRS ||  || align=right | 2.7 km || 
|-id=452 bgcolor=#d6d6d6
| 511452 ||  || — || January 18, 2013 || Haleakala || Pan-STARRS ||  || align=right | 2.6 km || 
|-id=453 bgcolor=#E9E9E9
| 511453 ||  || — || March 24, 2001 || Kitt Peak || Spacewatch ||  || align=right | 1.2 km || 
|-id=454 bgcolor=#d6d6d6
| 511454 ||  || — || August 3, 2004 || Siding Spring || SSS ||  || align=right | 2.8 km || 
|-id=455 bgcolor=#d6d6d6
| 511455 ||  || — || November 1, 2005 || Mount Lemmon || Mount Lemmon Survey ||  || align=right | 2.7 km || 
|-id=456 bgcolor=#E9E9E9
| 511456 ||  || — || December 12, 2012 || Kitt Peak || Spacewatch ||  || align=right | 2.1 km || 
|-id=457 bgcolor=#d6d6d6
| 511457 ||  || — || May 3, 2014 || Kitt Peak || Spacewatch ||  || align=right | 2.1 km || 
|-id=458 bgcolor=#d6d6d6
| 511458 ||  || — || November 24, 2011 || Haleakala || Pan-STARRS ||  || align=right | 2.6 km || 
|-id=459 bgcolor=#d6d6d6
| 511459 ||  || — || October 23, 2011 || Haleakala || Pan-STARRS || EOS || align=right | 1.9 km || 
|-id=460 bgcolor=#d6d6d6
| 511460 ||  || — || May 22, 2014 || Kitt Peak || Spacewatch ||  || align=right | 2.8 km || 
|-id=461 bgcolor=#d6d6d6
| 511461 ||  || — || April 5, 2003 || Kitt Peak || Spacewatch ||  || align=right | 2.5 km || 
|-id=462 bgcolor=#d6d6d6
| 511462 ||  || — || February 26, 2008 || Mount Lemmon || Mount Lemmon Survey ||  || align=right | 2.1 km || 
|-id=463 bgcolor=#d6d6d6
| 511463 ||  || — || April 20, 2014 || Kitt Peak || Spacewatch ||  || align=right | 3.1 km || 
|-id=464 bgcolor=#E9E9E9
| 511464 ||  || — || October 25, 2011 || Haleakala || Pan-STARRS ||  || align=right | 3.0 km || 
|-id=465 bgcolor=#d6d6d6
| 511465 ||  || — || May 5, 2014 || Haleakala || Pan-STARRS ||  || align=right | 3.0 km || 
|-id=466 bgcolor=#d6d6d6
| 511466 ||  || — || May 7, 2014 || Haleakala || Pan-STARRS ||  || align=right | 2.5 km || 
|-id=467 bgcolor=#d6d6d6
| 511467 ||  || — || August 22, 2004 || Kitt Peak || Spacewatch ||  || align=right | 2.3 km || 
|-id=468 bgcolor=#E9E9E9
| 511468 ||  || — || November 4, 2012 || Mount Lemmon || Mount Lemmon Survey ||  || align=right | 1.6 km || 
|-id=469 bgcolor=#E9E9E9
| 511469 ||  || — || December 29, 2008 || Mount Lemmon || Mount Lemmon Survey ||  || align=right | 2.5 km || 
|-id=470 bgcolor=#d6d6d6
| 511470 ||  || — || February 14, 2013 || Haleakala || Pan-STARRS ||  || align=right | 3.8 km || 
|-id=471 bgcolor=#E9E9E9
| 511471 ||  || — || January 17, 2013 || Mount Lemmon || Mount Lemmon Survey ||  || align=right | 2.6 km || 
|-id=472 bgcolor=#E9E9E9
| 511472 ||  || — || February 26, 2009 || Kitt Peak || Spacewatch || NEM || align=right | 2.1 km || 
|-id=473 bgcolor=#d6d6d6
| 511473 ||  || — || June 15, 2010 || WISE || WISE ||  || align=right | 2.4 km || 
|-id=474 bgcolor=#d6d6d6
| 511474 ||  || — || May 7, 2014 || Haleakala || Pan-STARRS ||  || align=right | 2.6 km || 
|-id=475 bgcolor=#d6d6d6
| 511475 ||  || — || February 14, 2013 || Mount Lemmon || Mount Lemmon Survey || TIR || align=right | 2.5 km || 
|-id=476 bgcolor=#E9E9E9
| 511476 ||  || — || April 2, 2009 || Kitt Peak || Spacewatch ||  || align=right | 2.1 km || 
|-id=477 bgcolor=#E9E9E9
| 511477 ||  || — || November 23, 2012 || Kitt Peak || Spacewatch ||  || align=right | 1.4 km || 
|-id=478 bgcolor=#E9E9E9
| 511478 ||  || — || April 4, 2014 || Haleakala || Pan-STARRS ||  || align=right | 2.0 km || 
|-id=479 bgcolor=#d6d6d6
| 511479 ||  || — || May 28, 2014 || Haleakala || Pan-STARRS ||  || align=right | 2.6 km || 
|-id=480 bgcolor=#d6d6d6
| 511480 ||  || — || September 22, 2003 || Kitt Peak || Spacewatch ||  || align=right | 2.2 km || 
|-id=481 bgcolor=#d6d6d6
| 511481 ||  || — || January 26, 2012 || Mount Lemmon || Mount Lemmon Survey ||  || align=right | 3.3 km || 
|-id=482 bgcolor=#E9E9E9
| 511482 ||  || — || January 17, 2013 || Haleakala || Pan-STARRS ||  || align=right | 2.1 km || 
|-id=483 bgcolor=#d6d6d6
| 511483 ||  || — || January 19, 2012 || Haleakala || Pan-STARRS || EOS || align=right | 2.3 km || 
|-id=484 bgcolor=#d6d6d6
| 511484 ||  || — || February 13, 2013 || Haleakala || Pan-STARRS ||  || align=right | 2.8 km || 
|-id=485 bgcolor=#d6d6d6
| 511485 ||  || — || March 12, 2008 || Mount Lemmon || Mount Lemmon Survey ||  || align=right | 2.4 km || 
|-id=486 bgcolor=#d6d6d6
| 511486 ||  || — || November 27, 2011 || Mount Lemmon || Mount Lemmon Survey ||  || align=right | 2.2 km || 
|-id=487 bgcolor=#E9E9E9
| 511487 ||  || — || March 10, 2005 || Catalina || CSS ||  || align=right | 1.8 km || 
|-id=488 bgcolor=#d6d6d6
| 511488 ||  || — || October 19, 2006 || Kitt Peak || Spacewatch ||  || align=right | 2.5 km || 
|-id=489 bgcolor=#d6d6d6
| 511489 ||  || — || May 26, 2014 || Haleakala || Pan-STARRS ||  || align=right | 2.7 km || 
|-id=490 bgcolor=#d6d6d6
| 511490 ||  || — || April 3, 2008 || Mount Lemmon || Mount Lemmon Survey ||  || align=right | 2.5 km || 
|-id=491 bgcolor=#d6d6d6
| 511491 ||  || — || January 19, 2012 || Kitt Peak || Spacewatch ||  || align=right | 2.7 km || 
|-id=492 bgcolor=#fefefe
| 511492 ||  || — || November 23, 2006 || Kitt Peak || Spacewatch || H || align=right data-sort-value="0.86" | 860 m || 
|-id=493 bgcolor=#d6d6d6
| 511493 ||  || — || April 20, 2007 || Siding Spring || SSS ||  || align=right | 5.3 km || 
|-id=494 bgcolor=#d6d6d6
| 511494 ||  || — || August 5, 2003 || Kitt Peak || Spacewatch ||  || align=right | 3.2 km || 
|-id=495 bgcolor=#d6d6d6
| 511495 ||  || — || January 28, 2007 || Kitt Peak || Spacewatch ||  || align=right | 2.5 km || 
|-id=496 bgcolor=#d6d6d6
| 511496 ||  || — || March 13, 2013 || Haleakala || Pan-STARRS ||  || align=right | 2.7 km || 
|-id=497 bgcolor=#d6d6d6
| 511497 ||  || — || December 27, 2006 || Mount Lemmon || Mount Lemmon Survey ||  || align=right | 3.5 km || 
|-id=498 bgcolor=#fefefe
| 511498 ||  || — || July 10, 2014 || Haleakala || Pan-STARRS || H || align=right data-sort-value="0.62" | 620 m || 
|-id=499 bgcolor=#d6d6d6
| 511499 ||  || — || December 25, 2005 || Kitt Peak || Spacewatch ||  || align=right | 3.2 km || 
|-id=500 bgcolor=#d6d6d6
| 511500 ||  || — || October 12, 2010 || Mount Lemmon || Mount Lemmon Survey ||  || align=right | 2.8 km || 
|}

511501–511600 

|-bgcolor=#d6d6d6
| 511501 ||  || — || January 29, 2007 || Kitt Peak || Spacewatch || TIR || align=right | 2.5 km || 
|-id=502 bgcolor=#d6d6d6
| 511502 ||  || — || April 28, 2014 || Haleakala || Pan-STARRS ||  || align=right | 3.5 km || 
|-id=503 bgcolor=#d6d6d6
| 511503 ||  || — || February 6, 2007 || Mount Lemmon || Mount Lemmon Survey ||  || align=right | 2.5 km || 
|-id=504 bgcolor=#d6d6d6
| 511504 ||  || — || February 3, 2012 || Mount Lemmon || Mount Lemmon Survey ||  || align=right | 3.4 km || 
|-id=505 bgcolor=#d6d6d6
| 511505 ||  || — || March 6, 2008 || Catalina || CSS ||  || align=right | 2.9 km || 
|-id=506 bgcolor=#fefefe
| 511506 ||  || — || August 18, 2006 || Kitt Peak || Spacewatch || H || align=right data-sort-value="0.61" | 610 m || 
|-id=507 bgcolor=#d6d6d6
| 511507 ||  || — || April 17, 2013 || Haleakala || Pan-STARRS ||  || align=right | 2.9 km || 
|-id=508 bgcolor=#d6d6d6
| 511508 ||  || — || April 19, 2013 || Haleakala || Pan-STARRS ||  || align=right | 3.1 km || 
|-id=509 bgcolor=#FA8072
| 511509 ||  || — || January 30, 2008 || Mount Lemmon || Mount Lemmon Survey || H || align=right data-sort-value="0.50" | 500 m || 
|-id=510 bgcolor=#d6d6d6
| 511510 ||  || — || December 29, 2011 || Mount Lemmon || Mount Lemmon Survey ||  || align=right | 3.9 km || 
|-id=511 bgcolor=#fefefe
| 511511 ||  || — || June 22, 2014 || Haleakala || Pan-STARRS ||  || align=right data-sort-value="0.79" | 790 m || 
|-id=512 bgcolor=#d6d6d6
| 511512 ||  || — || January 26, 2012 || Mount Lemmon || Mount Lemmon Survey ||  || align=right | 2.3 km || 
|-id=513 bgcolor=#fefefe
| 511513 ||  || — || May 25, 2006 || Kitt Peak || Spacewatch || H || align=right data-sort-value="0.49" | 490 m || 
|-id=514 bgcolor=#fefefe
| 511514 ||  || — || March 11, 2008 || Mount Lemmon || Mount Lemmon Survey || H || align=right data-sort-value="0.56" | 560 m || 
|-id=515 bgcolor=#d6d6d6
| 511515 ||  || — || March 14, 2007 || Catalina || CSS ||  || align=right | 2.9 km || 
|-id=516 bgcolor=#fefefe
| 511516 ||  || — || July 16, 2004 || Socorro || LINEAR || H || align=right data-sort-value="0.82" | 820 m || 
|-id=517 bgcolor=#fefefe
| 511517 ||  || — || January 30, 2008 || Kitt Peak || Spacewatch || H || align=right data-sort-value="0.58" | 580 m || 
|-id=518 bgcolor=#FA8072
| 511518 ||  || — || March 4, 2011 || Mount Lemmon || Mount Lemmon Survey || H || align=right data-sort-value="0.46" | 460 m || 
|-id=519 bgcolor=#fefefe
| 511519 ||  || — || February 9, 2010 || Catalina || CSS || H || align=right data-sort-value="0.77" | 770 m || 
|-id=520 bgcolor=#FFC2E0
| 511520 ||  || — || July 6, 2014 || Haleakala || Pan-STARRS || AMO || align=right data-sort-value="0.63" | 630 m || 
|-id=521 bgcolor=#fefefe
| 511521 ||  || — || March 19, 2013 || Haleakala || Pan-STARRS || H || align=right data-sort-value="0.53" | 530 m || 
|-id=522 bgcolor=#fefefe
| 511522 ||  || — || August 17, 2009 || Kitt Peak || Spacewatch || H || align=right data-sort-value="0.75" | 750 m || 
|-id=523 bgcolor=#FFC2E0
| 511523 ||  || — || August 31, 2014 || Haleakala || Pan-STARRS || AMO || align=right data-sort-value="0.45" | 450 m || 
|-id=524 bgcolor=#fefefe
| 511524 ||  || — || April 7, 2013 || Mount Lemmon || Mount Lemmon Survey || H || align=right data-sort-value="0.52" | 520 m || 
|-id=525 bgcolor=#C2FFFF
| 511525 ||  || — || April 29, 2009 || Kitt Peak || Spacewatch || L5 || align=right | 7.7 km || 
|-id=526 bgcolor=#fefefe
| 511526 ||  || — || June 3, 2014 || Haleakala || Pan-STARRS || H || align=right data-sort-value="0.75" | 750 m || 
|-id=527 bgcolor=#fefefe
| 511527 ||  || — || December 11, 2004 || Catalina || CSS || H || align=right data-sort-value="0.76" | 760 m || 
|-id=528 bgcolor=#fefefe
| 511528 ||  || — || November 21, 2006 || Catalina || CSS || H || align=right data-sort-value="0.81" | 810 m || 
|-id=529 bgcolor=#fefefe
| 511529 ||  || — || June 26, 2011 || Mount Lemmon || Mount Lemmon Survey || H || align=right data-sort-value="0.59" | 590 m || 
|-id=530 bgcolor=#E9E9E9
| 511530 ||  || — || December 25, 2006 || Kitt Peak || Spacewatch ||  || align=right | 1.3 km || 
|-id=531 bgcolor=#d6d6d6
| 511531 ||  || — || October 17, 2008 || Kitt Peak || Spacewatch ||  || align=right | 3.9 km || 
|-id=532 bgcolor=#fefefe
| 511532 ||  || — || December 17, 2009 || Mount Lemmon || Mount Lemmon Survey || H || align=right data-sort-value="0.68" | 680 m || 
|-id=533 bgcolor=#C2FFFF
| 511533 ||  || — || September 20, 2014 || Haleakala || Pan-STARRS || L5 || align=right | 10 km || 
|-id=534 bgcolor=#C2FFFF
| 511534 ||  || — || September 22, 2014 || Haleakala || Pan-STARRS || L5 || align=right | 9.7 km || 
|-id=535 bgcolor=#fefefe
| 511535 ||  || — || March 10, 2008 || Mount Lemmon || Mount Lemmon Survey || H || align=right data-sort-value="0.52" | 520 m || 
|-id=536 bgcolor=#fefefe
| 511536 ||  || — || June 27, 2011 || Kitt Peak || Spacewatch || H || align=right data-sort-value="0.81" | 810 m || 
|-id=537 bgcolor=#fefefe
| 511537 ||  || — || February 12, 2013 || Haleakala || Pan-STARRS || H || align=right data-sort-value="0.66" | 660 m || 
|-id=538 bgcolor=#fefefe
| 511538 ||  || — || November 11, 2009 || Mount Lemmon || Mount Lemmon Survey || H || align=right data-sort-value="0.72" | 720 m || 
|-id=539 bgcolor=#fefefe
| 511539 ||  || — || October 2, 2014 || Haleakala || Pan-STARRS || H || align=right data-sort-value="0.57" | 570 m || 
|-id=540 bgcolor=#fefefe
| 511540 ||  || — || October 2, 2014 || Haleakala || Pan-STARRS || H || align=right data-sort-value="0.54" | 540 m || 
|-id=541 bgcolor=#fefefe
| 511541 ||  || — || February 7, 2008 || Mount Lemmon || Mount Lemmon Survey || H || align=right data-sort-value="0.59" | 590 m || 
|-id=542 bgcolor=#fefefe
| 511542 ||  || — || July 27, 2011 || Siding Spring || SSS || H || align=right data-sort-value="0.76" | 760 m || 
|-id=543 bgcolor=#fefefe
| 511543 ||  || — || October 14, 2014 || Catalina || CSS || H || align=right data-sort-value="0.73" | 730 m || 
|-id=544 bgcolor=#fefefe
| 511544 ||  || — || September 20, 2011 || Haleakala || Pan-STARRS ||  || align=right data-sort-value="0.77" | 770 m || 
|-id=545 bgcolor=#fefefe
| 511545 ||  || — || August 23, 2011 || Haleakala || Pan-STARRS || H || align=right data-sort-value="0.47" | 470 m || 
|-id=546 bgcolor=#fefefe
| 511546 ||  || — || October 4, 2014 || Mount Lemmon || Mount Lemmon Survey || H || align=right data-sort-value="0.68" | 680 m || 
|-id=547 bgcolor=#d6d6d6
| 511547 ||  || — || September 28, 2006 || Kitt Peak || Spacewatch || 3:2 || align=right | 3.8 km || 
|-id=548 bgcolor=#FA8072
| 511548 ||  || — || October 26, 2009 || Mount Lemmon || Mount Lemmon Survey ||  || align=right data-sort-value="0.54" | 540 m || 
|-id=549 bgcolor=#fefefe
| 511549 ||  || — || April 17, 2013 || Haleakala || Pan-STARRS || H || align=right data-sort-value="0.51" | 510 m || 
|-id=550 bgcolor=#fefefe
| 511550 ||  || — || October 5, 2014 || Haleakala || Pan-STARRS || H || align=right data-sort-value="0.60" | 600 m || 
|-id=551 bgcolor=#C2E0FF
| 511551 ||  || — || August 8, 2013 || Mauna Kea || OSSOS || cubewano (cold)moon || align=right | 203 km || 
|-id=552 bgcolor=#C2E0FF
| 511552 ||  || — || August 8, 2013 || Mauna Kea || OSSOS || cubewano (cold) || align=right | 267 km || 
|-id=553 bgcolor=#C2E0FF
| 511553 ||  || — || November 29, 2013 || Mauna Kea || OSSOS || cubewano (hot)critical || align=right | 133 km || 
|-id=554 bgcolor=#C2E0FF
| 511554 ||  || — || September 1, 2013 || Mauna Kea || OSSOS || other TNOcritical || align=right | 147 km || 
|-id=555 bgcolor=#C2E0FF
| 511555 ||  || — || August 8, 2013 || Mauna Kea || OSSOS || other TNOcritical || align=right | 147 km || 
|-id=556 bgcolor=#fefefe
| 511556 ||  || — || July 29, 2014 || Haleakala || Pan-STARRS || H || align=right data-sort-value="0.73" | 730 m || 
|-id=557 bgcolor=#fefefe
| 511557 ||  || — || December 17, 2009 || Mount Lemmon || Mount Lemmon Survey || H || align=right data-sort-value="0.58" | 580 m || 
|-id=558 bgcolor=#fefefe
| 511558 ||  || — || May 28, 2008 || Kitt Peak || Spacewatch || H || align=right data-sort-value="0.66" | 660 m || 
|-id=559 bgcolor=#fefefe
| 511559 ||  || — || November 2, 2007 || Kitt Peak || Spacewatch ||  || align=right data-sort-value="0.54" | 540 m || 
|-id=560 bgcolor=#E9E9E9
| 511560 ||  || — || October 24, 2014 || Kitt Peak || Spacewatch ||  || align=right | 1.2 km || 
|-id=561 bgcolor=#fefefe
| 511561 ||  || — || January 29, 2009 || Mount Lemmon || Mount Lemmon Survey ||  || align=right data-sort-value="0.52" | 520 m || 
|-id=562 bgcolor=#fefefe
| 511562 ||  || — || November 19, 2003 || Socorro || LINEAR || H || align=right data-sort-value="0.63" | 630 m || 
|-id=563 bgcolor=#fefefe
| 511563 ||  || — || November 19, 2014 || Haleakala || Pan-STARRS || H || align=right data-sort-value="0.66" | 660 m || 
|-id=564 bgcolor=#C2FFFF
| 511564 ||  || — || April 21, 2009 || Kitt Peak || Spacewatch || L5 || align=right | 9.4 km || 
|-id=565 bgcolor=#E9E9E9
| 511565 ||  || — || November 28, 2005 || Mount Lemmon || Mount Lemmon Survey ||  || align=right | 1.8 km || 
|-id=566 bgcolor=#fefefe
| 511566 ||  || — || December 18, 2003 || Socorro || LINEAR || H || align=right data-sort-value="0.79" | 790 m || 
|-id=567 bgcolor=#fefefe
| 511567 ||  || — || September 16, 2014 || Haleakala || Pan-STARRS || H || align=right data-sort-value="0.65" | 650 m || 
|-id=568 bgcolor=#C2FFFF
| 511568 ||  || — || November 22, 2014 || Haleakala || Pan-STARRS || L5 || align=right | 8.9 km || 
|-id=569 bgcolor=#fefefe
| 511569 ||  || — || December 17, 2007 || Mount Lemmon || Mount Lemmon Survey ||  || align=right data-sort-value="0.81" | 810 m || 
|-id=570 bgcolor=#C2FFFF
| 511570 ||  || — || March 31, 2008 || Mount Lemmon || Mount Lemmon Survey || L5 || align=right | 13 km || 
|-id=571 bgcolor=#fefefe
| 511571 ||  || — || October 10, 2010 || Mount Lemmon || Mount Lemmon Survey ||  || align=right data-sort-value="0.95" | 950 m || 
|-id=572 bgcolor=#E9E9E9
| 511572 ||  || — || May 21, 2012 || Mount Lemmon || Mount Lemmon Survey ||  || align=right | 2.7 km || 
|-id=573 bgcolor=#fefefe
| 511573 ||  || — || November 29, 2003 || Kitt Peak || Spacewatch ||  || align=right data-sort-value="0.89" | 890 m || 
|-id=574 bgcolor=#fefefe
| 511574 ||  || — || October 13, 2010 || Mount Lemmon || Mount Lemmon Survey ||  || align=right data-sort-value="0.87" | 870 m || 
|-id=575 bgcolor=#E9E9E9
| 511575 ||  || — || March 3, 2006 || Catalina || CSS ||  || align=right | 2.8 km || 
|-id=576 bgcolor=#C2FFFF
| 511576 ||  || — || November 24, 2003 || Kitt Peak || Spacewatch || L5 || align=right | 7.7 km || 
|-id=577 bgcolor=#fefefe
| 511577 ||  || — || November 11, 2001 || Socorro || LINEAR || H || align=right data-sort-value="0.68" | 680 m || 
|-id=578 bgcolor=#fefefe
| 511578 ||  || — || March 7, 2005 || Socorro || LINEAR || H || align=right data-sort-value="0.78" | 780 m || 
|-id=579 bgcolor=#fefefe
| 511579 ||  || — || June 12, 2013 || Haleakala || Pan-STARRS || H || align=right data-sort-value="0.68" | 680 m || 
|-id=580 bgcolor=#fefefe
| 511580 ||  || — || November 21, 2006 || Catalina || CSS || H || align=right data-sort-value="0.81" | 810 m || 
|-id=581 bgcolor=#fefefe
| 511581 ||  || — || November 10, 2006 || Kitt Peak || Spacewatch || H || align=right data-sort-value="0.82" | 820 m || 
|-id=582 bgcolor=#C2FFFF
| 511582 ||  || — || September 6, 2012 || Haleakala || Pan-STARRS || L5 || align=right | 9.8 km || 
|-id=583 bgcolor=#fefefe
| 511583 ||  || — || September 20, 2011 || Kitt Peak || Spacewatch || H || align=right data-sort-value="0.66" | 660 m || 
|-id=584 bgcolor=#fefefe
| 511584 ||  || — || December 26, 2006 || Kitt Peak || Spacewatch || H || align=right data-sort-value="0.62" | 620 m || 
|-id=585 bgcolor=#fefefe
| 511585 ||  || — || January 19, 2005 || Kitt Peak || Spacewatch ||  || align=right data-sort-value="0.66" | 660 m || 
|-id=586 bgcolor=#fefefe
| 511586 ||  || — || November 21, 2006 || Kitt Peak || Spacewatch ||  || align=right | 1.1 km || 
|-id=587 bgcolor=#fefefe
| 511587 ||  || — || January 25, 1996 || Kitt Peak || Spacewatch || H || align=right data-sort-value="0.51" | 510 m || 
|-id=588 bgcolor=#fefefe
| 511588 ||  || — || November 19, 2007 || Mount Lemmon || Mount Lemmon Survey ||  || align=right data-sort-value="0.73" | 730 m || 
|-id=589 bgcolor=#fefefe
| 511589 ||  || — || August 4, 2003 || Kitt Peak || Spacewatch ||  || align=right data-sort-value="0.68" | 680 m || 
|-id=590 bgcolor=#fefefe
| 511590 ||  || — || March 24, 2004 || Anderson Mesa || LONEOS ||  || align=right data-sort-value="0.85" | 850 m || 
|-id=591 bgcolor=#fefefe
| 511591 ||  || — || April 25, 2006 || Kitt Peak || Spacewatch ||  || align=right data-sort-value="0.58" | 580 m || 
|-id=592 bgcolor=#fefefe
| 511592 ||  || — || December 21, 2014 || Haleakala || Pan-STARRS ||  || align=right data-sort-value="0.60" | 600 m || 
|-id=593 bgcolor=#fefefe
| 511593 ||  || — || August 18, 2009 || Kitt Peak || Spacewatch ||  || align=right data-sort-value="0.68" | 680 m || 
|-id=594 bgcolor=#fefefe
| 511594 ||  || — || March 10, 2007 || Catalina || CSS || H || align=right data-sort-value="0.68" | 680 m || 
|-id=595 bgcolor=#fefefe
| 511595 ||  || — || November 18, 2003 || Kitt Peak || Spacewatch ||  || align=right data-sort-value="0.63" | 630 m || 
|-id=596 bgcolor=#fefefe
| 511596 ||  || — || November 2, 2010 || Mount Lemmon || Mount Lemmon Survey ||  || align=right data-sort-value="0.57" | 570 m || 
|-id=597 bgcolor=#fefefe
| 511597 ||  || — || January 1, 2008 || Kitt Peak || Spacewatch ||  || align=right data-sort-value="0.90" | 900 m || 
|-id=598 bgcolor=#E9E9E9
| 511598 ||  || — || August 25, 2004 || Kitt Peak || Spacewatch ||  || align=right | 1.1 km || 
|-id=599 bgcolor=#E9E9E9
| 511599 ||  || — || November 17, 2009 || Mount Lemmon || Mount Lemmon Survey ||  || align=right | 2.5 km || 
|-id=600 bgcolor=#FFC2E0
| 511600 ||  || — || November 26, 2014 || Haleakala || Pan-STARRS || APO +1km || align=right | 1.4 km || 
|}

511601–511700 

|-bgcolor=#fefefe
| 511601 ||  || — || January 14, 2015 || Haleakala || Pan-STARRS ||  || align=right data-sort-value="0.49" | 490 m || 
|-id=602 bgcolor=#fefefe
| 511602 ||  || — || January 20, 2008 || Kitt Peak || Spacewatch ||  || align=right data-sort-value="0.66" | 660 m || 
|-id=603 bgcolor=#fefefe
| 511603 ||  || — || February 7, 2008 || Mount Lemmon || Mount Lemmon Survey ||  || align=right | 1.7 km || 
|-id=604 bgcolor=#fefefe
| 511604 ||  || — || January 16, 2015 || Kitt Peak || Spacewatch ||  || align=right data-sort-value="0.76" | 760 m || 
|-id=605 bgcolor=#fefefe
| 511605 ||  || — || January 27, 2004 || Kitt Peak || Spacewatch ||  || align=right data-sort-value="0.53" | 530 m || 
|-id=606 bgcolor=#E9E9E9
| 511606 ||  || — || September 18, 2003 || Kitt Peak || Spacewatch ||  || align=right | 2.5 km || 
|-id=607 bgcolor=#fefefe
| 511607 ||  || — || December 13, 2010 || Mount Lemmon || Mount Lemmon Survey ||  || align=right data-sort-value="0.90" | 900 m || 
|-id=608 bgcolor=#E9E9E9
| 511608 ||  || — || December 10, 2009 || Mount Lemmon || Mount Lemmon Survey ||  || align=right | 2.1 km || 
|-id=609 bgcolor=#fefefe
| 511609 ||  || — || November 10, 2010 || Mount Lemmon || Mount Lemmon Survey ||  || align=right data-sort-value="0.71" | 710 m || 
|-id=610 bgcolor=#fefefe
| 511610 ||  || — || September 11, 2010 || Kitt Peak || Spacewatch ||  || align=right data-sort-value="0.64" | 640 m || 
|-id=611 bgcolor=#fefefe
| 511611 ||  || — || September 15, 2007 || Mount Lemmon || Mount Lemmon Survey ||  || align=right data-sort-value="0.59" | 590 m || 
|-id=612 bgcolor=#fefefe
| 511612 ||  || — || September 13, 2013 || Kitt Peak || Spacewatch ||  || align=right data-sort-value="0.69" | 690 m || 
|-id=613 bgcolor=#E9E9E9
| 511613 ||  || — || November 11, 2009 || Kitt Peak || Spacewatch ||  || align=right | 1.4 km || 
|-id=614 bgcolor=#fefefe
| 511614 ||  || — || March 11, 2005 || Kitt Peak || Spacewatch ||  || align=right data-sort-value="0.80" | 800 m || 
|-id=615 bgcolor=#E9E9E9
| 511615 ||  || — || March 2, 2006 || Kitt Peak || Spacewatch ||  || align=right | 1.9 km || 
|-id=616 bgcolor=#fefefe
| 511616 ||  || — || September 18, 2010 || Mount Lemmon || Mount Lemmon Survey ||  || align=right data-sort-value="0.62" | 620 m || 
|-id=617 bgcolor=#fefefe
| 511617 ||  || — || March 10, 2008 || Kitt Peak || Spacewatch ||  || align=right data-sort-value="0.57" | 570 m || 
|-id=618 bgcolor=#E9E9E9
| 511618 ||  || — || October 1, 2003 || Kitt Peak || Spacewatch ||  || align=right | 2.0 km || 
|-id=619 bgcolor=#fefefe
| 511619 ||  || — || November 1, 2010 || Mount Lemmon || Mount Lemmon Survey ||  || align=right data-sort-value="0.63" | 630 m || 
|-id=620 bgcolor=#d6d6d6
| 511620 ||  || — || November 4, 2013 || Haleakala || Pan-STARRS || 7:4 || align=right | 4.0 km || 
|-id=621 bgcolor=#d6d6d6
| 511621 ||  || — || November 30, 2008 || Mount Lemmon || Mount Lemmon Survey ||  || align=right | 3.0 km || 
|-id=622 bgcolor=#fefefe
| 511622 ||  || — || March 11, 2008 || Kitt Peak || Spacewatch ||  || align=right data-sort-value="0.73" | 730 m || 
|-id=623 bgcolor=#d6d6d6
| 511623 ||  || — || October 28, 2013 || Mount Lemmon || Mount Lemmon Survey ||  || align=right | 2.6 km || 
|-id=624 bgcolor=#fefefe
| 511624 ||  || — || February 27, 2012 || Haleakala || Pan-STARRS ||  || align=right data-sort-value="0.60" | 600 m || 
|-id=625 bgcolor=#E9E9E9
| 511625 ||  || — || October 2, 2008 || Mount Lemmon || Mount Lemmon Survey ||  || align=right | 2.0 km || 
|-id=626 bgcolor=#fefefe
| 511626 ||  || — || July 18, 2007 || Mount Lemmon || Mount Lemmon Survey ||  || align=right data-sort-value="0.49" | 490 m || 
|-id=627 bgcolor=#E9E9E9
| 511627 ||  || — || January 30, 2011 || Haleakala || Pan-STARRS ||  || align=right data-sort-value="0.86" | 860 m || 
|-id=628 bgcolor=#fefefe
| 511628 ||  || — || February 1, 2008 || Kitt Peak || Spacewatch ||  || align=right data-sort-value="0.65" | 650 m || 
|-id=629 bgcolor=#fefefe
| 511629 ||  || — || February 29, 2008 || Kitt Peak || Spacewatch ||  || align=right data-sort-value="0.69" | 690 m || 
|-id=630 bgcolor=#d6d6d6
| 511630 ||  || — || September 18, 2003 || Kitt Peak || Spacewatch ||  || align=right | 2.9 km || 
|-id=631 bgcolor=#fefefe
| 511631 ||  || — || January 16, 2011 || Mount Lemmon || Mount Lemmon Survey ||  || align=right data-sort-value="0.55" | 550 m || 
|-id=632 bgcolor=#E9E9E9
| 511632 ||  || — || September 22, 2008 || Kitt Peak || Spacewatch ||  || align=right | 2.0 km || 
|-id=633 bgcolor=#fefefe
| 511633 ||  || — || December 15, 2010 || Mount Lemmon || Mount Lemmon Survey ||  || align=right data-sort-value="0.70" | 700 m || 
|-id=634 bgcolor=#d6d6d6
| 511634 ||  || — || January 15, 2005 || Kitt Peak || Spacewatch ||  || align=right | 2.5 km || 
|-id=635 bgcolor=#E9E9E9
| 511635 ||  || — || March 18, 2007 || Kitt Peak || Spacewatch ||  || align=right | 1.4 km || 
|-id=636 bgcolor=#fefefe
| 511636 ||  || — || April 15, 2012 || Haleakala || Pan-STARRS ||  || align=right data-sort-value="0.65" | 650 m || 
|-id=637 bgcolor=#fefefe
| 511637 ||  || — || March 29, 2008 || Kitt Peak || Spacewatch ||  || align=right data-sort-value="0.86" | 860 m || 
|-id=638 bgcolor=#fefefe
| 511638 ||  || — || September 11, 2010 || Kitt Peak || Spacewatch ||  || align=right data-sort-value="0.75" | 750 m || 
|-id=639 bgcolor=#fefefe
| 511639 ||  || — || March 4, 2012 || Mount Lemmon || Mount Lemmon Survey ||  || align=right data-sort-value="0.58" | 580 m || 
|-id=640 bgcolor=#fefefe
| 511640 ||  || — || November 10, 2010 || Kitt Peak || Spacewatch ||  || align=right data-sort-value="0.75" | 750 m || 
|-id=641 bgcolor=#fefefe
| 511641 ||  || — || February 9, 2008 || Kitt Peak || Spacewatch ||  || align=right | 1.0 km || 
|-id=642 bgcolor=#fefefe
| 511642 ||  || — || October 13, 2013 || Mount Lemmon || Mount Lemmon Survey ||  || align=right data-sort-value="0.75" | 750 m || 
|-id=643 bgcolor=#fefefe
| 511643 ||  || — || October 13, 2007 || Catalina || CSS ||  || align=right data-sort-value="0.54" | 540 m || 
|-id=644 bgcolor=#fefefe
| 511644 ||  || — || January 17, 2015 || Haleakala || Pan-STARRS ||  || align=right data-sort-value="0.62" | 620 m || 
|-id=645 bgcolor=#fefefe
| 511645 ||  || — || March 25, 2012 || Mount Lemmon || Mount Lemmon Survey ||  || align=right data-sort-value="0.73" | 730 m || 
|-id=646 bgcolor=#fefefe
| 511646 ||  || — || July 14, 2009 || Kitt Peak || Spacewatch ||  || align=right data-sort-value="0.93" | 930 m || 
|-id=647 bgcolor=#fefefe
| 511647 ||  || — || December 14, 2010 || Mount Lemmon || Mount Lemmon Survey || V || align=right data-sort-value="0.69" | 690 m || 
|-id=648 bgcolor=#fefefe
| 511648 ||  || — || December 18, 2014 || Haleakala || Pan-STARRS ||  || align=right data-sort-value="0.86" | 860 m || 
|-id=649 bgcolor=#fefefe
| 511649 ||  || — || October 6, 2013 || Mount Lemmon || Mount Lemmon Survey ||  || align=right data-sort-value="0.74" | 740 m || 
|-id=650 bgcolor=#fefefe
| 511650 ||  || — || January 18, 2015 || Haleakala || Pan-STARRS ||  || align=right data-sort-value="0.78" | 780 m || 
|-id=651 bgcolor=#E9E9E9
| 511651 ||  || — || December 8, 2005 || Kitt Peak || Spacewatch ||  || align=right | 1.4 km || 
|-id=652 bgcolor=#fefefe
| 511652 ||  || — || September 1, 2010 || Mount Lemmon || Mount Lemmon Survey ||  || align=right data-sort-value="0.49" | 490 m || 
|-id=653 bgcolor=#fefefe
| 511653 ||  || — || January 19, 2015 || Kitt Peak || Spacewatch ||  || align=right data-sort-value="0.57" | 570 m || 
|-id=654 bgcolor=#fefefe
| 511654 ||  || — || April 15, 2012 || Haleakala || Pan-STARRS ||  || align=right data-sort-value="0.59" | 590 m || 
|-id=655 bgcolor=#E9E9E9
| 511655 ||  || — || November 8, 2009 || Kitt Peak || Spacewatch ||  || align=right | 1.7 km || 
|-id=656 bgcolor=#E9E9E9
| 511656 ||  || — || October 8, 2008 || Mount Lemmon || Mount Lemmon Survey ||  || align=right | 2.5 km || 
|-id=657 bgcolor=#fefefe
| 511657 ||  || — || January 30, 2011 || Mount Lemmon || Mount Lemmon Survey ||  || align=right data-sort-value="0.69" | 690 m || 
|-id=658 bgcolor=#fefefe
| 511658 ||  || — || May 3, 2008 || Mount Lemmon || Mount Lemmon Survey ||  || align=right data-sort-value="0.76" | 760 m || 
|-id=659 bgcolor=#fefefe
| 511659 ||  || — || September 14, 2013 || Haleakala || Pan-STARRS ||  || align=right data-sort-value="0.75" | 750 m || 
|-id=660 bgcolor=#fefefe
| 511660 ||  || — || October 2, 2006 || Mount Lemmon || Mount Lemmon Survey || V || align=right data-sort-value="0.54" | 540 m || 
|-id=661 bgcolor=#fefefe
| 511661 ||  || — || November 10, 2013 || Mount Lemmon || Mount Lemmon Survey ||  || align=right data-sort-value="0.70" | 700 m || 
|-id=662 bgcolor=#fefefe
| 511662 ||  || — || October 2, 2006 || Mount Lemmon || Mount Lemmon Survey ||  || align=right data-sort-value="0.71" | 710 m || 
|-id=663 bgcolor=#fefefe
| 511663 ||  || — || April 13, 2004 || Kitt Peak || Spacewatch ||  || align=right | 1.1 km || 
|-id=664 bgcolor=#fefefe
| 511664 ||  || — || March 9, 2011 || Mount Lemmon || Mount Lemmon Survey ||  || align=right data-sort-value="0.92" | 920 m || 
|-id=665 bgcolor=#fefefe
| 511665 ||  || — || October 15, 2007 || Mount Lemmon || Mount Lemmon Survey ||  || align=right data-sort-value="0.60" | 600 m || 
|-id=666 bgcolor=#fefefe
| 511666 ||  || — || October 13, 2007 || Mount Lemmon || Mount Lemmon Survey ||  || align=right data-sort-value="0.57" | 570 m || 
|-id=667 bgcolor=#fefefe
| 511667 ||  || — || December 5, 2007 || Kitt Peak || Spacewatch ||  || align=right data-sort-value="0.65" | 650 m || 
|-id=668 bgcolor=#fefefe
| 511668 ||  || — || September 12, 2010 || Kitt Peak || Spacewatch ||  || align=right data-sort-value="0.80" | 800 m || 
|-id=669 bgcolor=#E9E9E9
| 511669 ||  || — || January 22, 2006 || Mount Lemmon || Mount Lemmon Survey ||  || align=right | 1.9 km || 
|-id=670 bgcolor=#fefefe
| 511670 ||  || — || January 26, 2001 || Kitt Peak || Spacewatch ||  || align=right data-sort-value="0.54" | 540 m || 
|-id=671 bgcolor=#fefefe
| 511671 ||  || — || February 7, 2002 || Kitt Peak || Spacewatch ||  || align=right data-sort-value="0.55" | 550 m || 
|-id=672 bgcolor=#fefefe
| 511672 ||  || — || March 17, 2009 || Kitt Peak || Spacewatch ||  || align=right data-sort-value="0.81" | 810 m || 
|-id=673 bgcolor=#fefefe
| 511673 ||  || — || November 26, 2010 || Mount Lemmon || Mount Lemmon Survey ||  || align=right data-sort-value="0.73" | 730 m || 
|-id=674 bgcolor=#fefefe
| 511674 ||  || — || February 9, 2005 || Kitt Peak || Spacewatch ||  || align=right data-sort-value="0.56" | 560 m || 
|-id=675 bgcolor=#d6d6d6
| 511675 ||  || — || October 8, 2008 || Kitt Peak || Spacewatch ||  || align=right | 1.7 km || 
|-id=676 bgcolor=#fefefe
| 511676 ||  || — || February 27, 2012 || Haleakala || Pan-STARRS ||  || align=right data-sort-value="0.49" | 490 m || 
|-id=677 bgcolor=#E9E9E9
| 511677 ||  || — || January 27, 2007 || Kitt Peak || Spacewatch ||  || align=right | 1.6 km || 
|-id=678 bgcolor=#E9E9E9
| 511678 ||  || — || March 15, 2007 || Kitt Peak || Spacewatch ||  || align=right data-sort-value="0.79" | 790 m || 
|-id=679 bgcolor=#fefefe
| 511679 ||  || — || September 17, 2010 || Mount Lemmon || Mount Lemmon Survey ||  || align=right data-sort-value="0.44" | 440 m || 
|-id=680 bgcolor=#fefefe
| 511680 ||  || — || March 28, 2012 || Kitt Peak || Spacewatch ||  || align=right data-sort-value="0.57" | 570 m || 
|-id=681 bgcolor=#fefefe
| 511681 ||  || — || October 3, 2013 || Haleakala || Pan-STARRS ||  || align=right data-sort-value="0.75" | 750 m || 
|-id=682 bgcolor=#E9E9E9
| 511682 ||  || — || January 20, 2015 || Haleakala || Pan-STARRS ||  || align=right | 1.7 km || 
|-id=683 bgcolor=#fefefe
| 511683 ||  || — || January 27, 2012 || Kitt Peak || Spacewatch ||  || align=right data-sort-value="0.60" | 600 m || 
|-id=684 bgcolor=#FFC2E0
| 511684 ||  || — || January 22, 2015 || Mount Lemmon || Mount Lemmon Survey || APOPHA || align=right data-sort-value="0.32" | 320 m || 
|-id=685 bgcolor=#fefefe
| 511685 ||  || — || January 24, 2015 || Haleakala || Pan-STARRS || H || align=right data-sort-value="0.65" | 650 m || 
|-id=686 bgcolor=#fefefe
| 511686 ||  || — || November 13, 2010 || Mount Lemmon || Mount Lemmon Survey ||  || align=right data-sort-value="0.74" | 740 m || 
|-id=687 bgcolor=#fefefe
| 511687 ||  || — || December 1, 2010 || Mount Lemmon || Mount Lemmon Survey ||  || align=right data-sort-value="0.79" | 790 m || 
|-id=688 bgcolor=#C2FFFF
| 511688 ||  || — || June 26, 2011 || Mount Lemmon || Mount Lemmon Survey || L5 || align=right | 9.9 km || 
|-id=689 bgcolor=#fefefe
| 511689 ||  || — || January 16, 2015 || Haleakala || Pan-STARRS || H || align=right data-sort-value="0.66" | 660 m || 
|-id=690 bgcolor=#fefefe
| 511690 ||  || — || January 27, 2015 || Haleakala || Pan-STARRS ||  || align=right | 1.00 km || 
|-id=691 bgcolor=#E9E9E9
| 511691 ||  || — || January 25, 2015 || Haleakala || Pan-STARRS ||  || align=right | 1.5 km || 
|-id=692 bgcolor=#fefefe
| 511692 ||  || — || March 4, 2005 || Mount Lemmon || Mount Lemmon Survey ||  || align=right data-sort-value="0.66" | 660 m || 
|-id=693 bgcolor=#E9E9E9
| 511693 ||  || — || February 2, 2006 || Kitt Peak || Spacewatch ||  || align=right | 1.6 km || 
|-id=694 bgcolor=#E9E9E9
| 511694 ||  || — || November 2, 2007 || Catalina || CSS ||  || align=right | 3.1 km || 
|-id=695 bgcolor=#fefefe
| 511695 ||  || — || July 2, 2013 || Haleakala || Pan-STARRS || H || align=right | 1.0 km || 
|-id=696 bgcolor=#E9E9E9
| 511696 ||  || — || January 17, 2015 || Kitt Peak || Spacewatch ||  || align=right | 2.3 km || 
|-id=697 bgcolor=#fefefe
| 511697 ||  || — || February 25, 2012 || Mount Lemmon || Mount Lemmon Survey ||  || align=right data-sort-value="0.67" | 670 m || 
|-id=698 bgcolor=#fefefe
| 511698 ||  || — || April 24, 2004 || Kitt Peak || Spacewatch ||  || align=right data-sort-value="0.91" | 910 m || 
|-id=699 bgcolor=#fefefe
| 511699 ||  || — || February 16, 2001 || Socorro || LINEAR || H || align=right data-sort-value="0.69" | 690 m || 
|-id=700 bgcolor=#E9E9E9
| 511700 ||  || — || May 20, 2007 || Catalina || CSS ||  || align=right | 1.5 km || 
|}

511701–511800 

|-bgcolor=#fefefe
| 511701 ||  || — || March 1, 2012 || Mount Lemmon || Mount Lemmon Survey ||  || align=right data-sort-value="0.78" | 780 m || 
|-id=702 bgcolor=#d6d6d6
| 511702 ||  || — || January 21, 2015 || Haleakala || Pan-STARRS ||  || align=right | 2.2 km || 
|-id=703 bgcolor=#d6d6d6
| 511703 ||  || — || November 26, 2014 || Haleakala || Pan-STARRS ||  || align=right | 3.9 km || 
|-id=704 bgcolor=#E9E9E9
| 511704 ||  || — || September 4, 2008 || Kitt Peak || Spacewatch ||  || align=right | 2.1 km || 
|-id=705 bgcolor=#d6d6d6
| 511705 ||  || — || January 18, 2015 || Kitt Peak || Spacewatch ||  || align=right | 2.3 km || 
|-id=706 bgcolor=#fefefe
| 511706 ||  || — || March 11, 2005 || Mount Lemmon || Mount Lemmon Survey ||  || align=right data-sort-value="0.62" | 620 m || 
|-id=707 bgcolor=#fefefe
| 511707 ||  || — || August 27, 2006 || Kitt Peak || Spacewatch ||  || align=right data-sort-value="0.74" | 740 m || 
|-id=708 bgcolor=#fefefe
| 511708 ||  || — || October 9, 2013 || Mount Lemmon || Mount Lemmon Survey ||  || align=right data-sort-value="0.71" | 710 m || 
|-id=709 bgcolor=#fefefe
| 511709 ||  || — || March 28, 2012 || Kitt Peak || Spacewatch ||  || align=right data-sort-value="0.59" | 590 m || 
|-id=710 bgcolor=#fefefe
| 511710 ||  || — || February 4, 2005 || Mount Lemmon || Mount Lemmon Survey ||  || align=right data-sort-value="0.52" | 520 m || 
|-id=711 bgcolor=#fefefe
| 511711 ||  || — || February 9, 2005 || Kitt Peak || Spacewatch ||  || align=right data-sort-value="0.75" | 750 m || 
|-id=712 bgcolor=#fefefe
| 511712 ||  || — || September 19, 2010 || Kitt Peak || Spacewatch ||  || align=right data-sort-value="0.52" | 520 m || 
|-id=713 bgcolor=#fefefe
| 511713 ||  || — || December 8, 2010 || Mount Lemmon || Mount Lemmon Survey ||  || align=right data-sort-value="0.83" | 830 m || 
|-id=714 bgcolor=#fefefe
| 511714 ||  || — || January 2, 2011 || Mount Lemmon || Mount Lemmon Survey ||  || align=right data-sort-value="0.68" | 680 m || 
|-id=715 bgcolor=#fefefe
| 511715 ||  || — || February 28, 2008 || Kitt Peak || Spacewatch ||  || align=right data-sort-value="0.77" | 770 m || 
|-id=716 bgcolor=#fefefe
| 511716 ||  || — || November 27, 2013 || Haleakala || Pan-STARRS ||  || align=right data-sort-value="0.92" | 920 m || 
|-id=717 bgcolor=#fefefe
| 511717 ||  || — || January 13, 2011 || Mount Lemmon || Mount Lemmon Survey ||  || align=right data-sort-value="0.78" | 780 m || 
|-id=718 bgcolor=#d6d6d6
| 511718 ||  || — || October 16, 2012 || Mount Lemmon || Mount Lemmon Survey ||  || align=right | 2.2 km || 
|-id=719 bgcolor=#d6d6d6
| 511719 ||  || — || November 8, 2013 || Mount Lemmon || Mount Lemmon Survey ||  || align=right | 4.0 km || 
|-id=720 bgcolor=#E9E9E9
| 511720 ||  || — || January 23, 2014 || Mount Lemmon || Mount Lemmon Survey ||  || align=right | 1.4 km || 
|-id=721 bgcolor=#fefefe
| 511721 ||  || — || October 11, 2010 || Mount Lemmon || Mount Lemmon Survey ||  || align=right data-sort-value="0.49" | 490 m || 
|-id=722 bgcolor=#fefefe
| 511722 ||  || — || February 24, 2012 || Mount Lemmon || Mount Lemmon Survey ||  || align=right data-sort-value="0.94" | 940 m || 
|-id=723 bgcolor=#fefefe
| 511723 ||  || — || March 14, 1999 || Kitt Peak || Spacewatch ||  || align=right data-sort-value="0.76" | 760 m || 
|-id=724 bgcolor=#E9E9E9
| 511724 ||  || — || January 25, 2006 || Kitt Peak || Spacewatch ||  || align=right | 2.4 km || 
|-id=725 bgcolor=#fefefe
| 511725 ||  || — || February 10, 2008 || Kitt Peak || Spacewatch ||  || align=right data-sort-value="0.89" | 890 m || 
|-id=726 bgcolor=#fefefe
| 511726 ||  || — || November 12, 2006 || Mount Lemmon || Mount Lemmon Survey ||  || align=right data-sort-value="0.84" | 840 m || 
|-id=727 bgcolor=#E9E9E9
| 511727 ||  || — || January 19, 2015 || Mount Lemmon || Mount Lemmon Survey ||  || align=right | 1.1 km || 
|-id=728 bgcolor=#E9E9E9
| 511728 ||  || — || December 3, 2013 || Haleakala || Pan-STARRS ||  || align=right | 1.8 km || 
|-id=729 bgcolor=#fefefe
| 511729 ||  || — || January 18, 2008 || Mount Lemmon || Mount Lemmon Survey ||  || align=right data-sort-value="0.60" | 600 m || 
|-id=730 bgcolor=#fefefe
| 511730 ||  || — || October 2, 2006 || Mount Lemmon || Mount Lemmon Survey ||  || align=right data-sort-value="0.76" | 760 m || 
|-id=731 bgcolor=#fefefe
| 511731 ||  || — || January 5, 2011 || Mount Lemmon || Mount Lemmon Survey ||  || align=right data-sort-value="0.81" | 810 m || 
|-id=732 bgcolor=#fefefe
| 511732 ||  || — || February 12, 2008 || Mount Lemmon || Mount Lemmon Survey ||  || align=right data-sort-value="0.82" | 820 m || 
|-id=733 bgcolor=#fefefe
| 511733 ||  || — || January 27, 2015 || Haleakala || Pan-STARRS ||  || align=right data-sort-value="0.90" | 900 m || 
|-id=734 bgcolor=#fefefe
| 511734 ||  || — || November 10, 2010 || Mount Lemmon || Mount Lemmon Survey ||  || align=right data-sort-value="0.54" | 540 m || 
|-id=735 bgcolor=#d6d6d6
| 511735 ||  || — || January 21, 2015 || Haleakala || Pan-STARRS ||  || align=right | 2.0 km || 
|-id=736 bgcolor=#fefefe
| 511736 ||  || — || September 17, 2006 || Kitt Peak || Spacewatch ||  || align=right data-sort-value="0.84" | 840 m || 
|-id=737 bgcolor=#fefefe
| 511737 ||  || — || January 27, 2015 || Haleakala || Pan-STARRS ||  || align=right data-sort-value="0.65" | 650 m || 
|-id=738 bgcolor=#fefefe
| 511738 ||  || — || January 24, 2015 || Mount Lemmon || Mount Lemmon Survey ||  || align=right data-sort-value="0.47" | 470 m || 
|-id=739 bgcolor=#fefefe
| 511739 ||  || — || February 29, 2008 || Kitt Peak || Spacewatch ||  || align=right data-sort-value="0.86" | 860 m || 
|-id=740 bgcolor=#E9E9E9
| 511740 ||  || — || October 25, 2013 || Mount Lemmon || Mount Lemmon Survey ||  || align=right | 2.0 km || 
|-id=741 bgcolor=#E9E9E9
| 511741 ||  || — || April 23, 2011 || Haleakala || Pan-STARRS ||  || align=right | 1.1 km || 
|-id=742 bgcolor=#fefefe
| 511742 ||  || — || March 6, 2008 || Mount Lemmon || Mount Lemmon Survey ||  || align=right data-sort-value="0.67" | 670 m || 
|-id=743 bgcolor=#E9E9E9
| 511743 ||  || — || December 11, 2009 || Mount Lemmon || Mount Lemmon Survey ||  || align=right | 1.3 km || 
|-id=744 bgcolor=#fefefe
| 511744 ||  || — || February 13, 2008 || Mount Lemmon || Mount Lemmon Survey ||  || align=right data-sort-value="0.78" | 780 m || 
|-id=745 bgcolor=#fefefe
| 511745 ||  || — || March 3, 2008 || Mount Lemmon || Mount Lemmon Survey || V || align=right data-sort-value="0.59" | 590 m || 
|-id=746 bgcolor=#d6d6d6
| 511746 ||  || — || April 26, 2004 || Socorro || LINEAR ||  || align=right | 4.0 km || 
|-id=747 bgcolor=#fefefe
| 511747 ||  || — || October 22, 2006 || Mount Lemmon || Mount Lemmon Survey ||  || align=right data-sort-value="0.85" | 850 m || 
|-id=748 bgcolor=#fefefe
| 511748 ||  || — || November 9, 2013 || Mount Lemmon || Mount Lemmon Survey ||  || align=right data-sort-value="0.76" | 760 m || 
|-id=749 bgcolor=#fefefe
| 511749 ||  || — || February 10, 2011 || Catalina || CSS ||  || align=right | 1.1 km || 
|-id=750 bgcolor=#E9E9E9
| 511750 ||  || — || February 17, 2015 || Haleakala || Pan-STARRS ||  || align=right data-sort-value="0.94" | 940 m || 
|-id=751 bgcolor=#E9E9E9
| 511751 ||  || — || December 31, 2013 || Haleakala || Pan-STARRS ||  || align=right | 1.8 km || 
|-id=752 bgcolor=#fefefe
| 511752 ||  || — || September 3, 2010 || Mount Lemmon || Mount Lemmon Survey ||  || align=right data-sort-value="0.58" | 580 m || 
|-id=753 bgcolor=#d6d6d6
| 511753 ||  || — || November 29, 2014 || Haleakala || Pan-STARRS ||  || align=right | 2.5 km || 
|-id=754 bgcolor=#E9E9E9
| 511754 ||  || — || June 13, 2008 || Kitt Peak || Spacewatch ||  || align=right | 1.4 km || 
|-id=755 bgcolor=#fefefe
| 511755 ||  || — || November 28, 2014 || Haleakala || Pan-STARRS ||  || align=right data-sort-value="0.98" | 980 m || 
|-id=756 bgcolor=#fefefe
| 511756 ||  || — || November 10, 2010 || Mount Lemmon || Mount Lemmon Survey ||  || align=right data-sort-value="0.59" | 590 m || 
|-id=757 bgcolor=#fefefe
| 511757 ||  || — || January 19, 2015 || Haleakala || Pan-STARRS ||  || align=right data-sort-value="0.90" | 900 m || 
|-id=758 bgcolor=#d6d6d6
| 511758 ||  || — || October 6, 2012 || Kitt Peak || Spacewatch ||  || align=right | 3.5 km || 
|-id=759 bgcolor=#fefefe
| 511759 ||  || — || October 25, 2013 || Kitt Peak || Spacewatch ||  || align=right data-sort-value="0.84" | 840 m || 
|-id=760 bgcolor=#fefefe
| 511760 ||  || — || December 30, 2007 || Kitt Peak || Spacewatch ||  || align=right data-sort-value="0.89" | 890 m || 
|-id=761 bgcolor=#fefefe
| 511761 ||  || — || March 23, 2004 || Socorro || LINEAR ||  || align=right data-sort-value="0.86" | 860 m || 
|-id=762 bgcolor=#E9E9E9
| 511762 ||  || — || June 23, 2007 || Kitt Peak || Spacewatch ||  || align=right | 1.1 km || 
|-id=763 bgcolor=#fefefe
| 511763 ||  || — || February 16, 2015 || Haleakala || Pan-STARRS ||  || align=right data-sort-value="0.89" | 890 m || 
|-id=764 bgcolor=#E9E9E9
| 511764 ||  || — || February 14, 2002 || Kitt Peak || Spacewatch ||  || align=right data-sort-value="0.98" | 980 m || 
|-id=765 bgcolor=#fefefe
| 511765 ||  || — || November 9, 2013 || Haleakala || Pan-STARRS ||  || align=right data-sort-value="0.90" | 900 m || 
|-id=766 bgcolor=#fefefe
| 511766 ||  || — || December 14, 2010 || Kitt Peak || Spacewatch ||  || align=right data-sort-value="0.73" | 730 m || 
|-id=767 bgcolor=#fefefe
| 511767 ||  || — || December 13, 2006 || Kitt Peak || Spacewatch ||  || align=right data-sort-value="0.99" | 990 m || 
|-id=768 bgcolor=#fefefe
| 511768 ||  || — || March 9, 2011 || Mount Lemmon || Mount Lemmon Survey ||  || align=right data-sort-value="0.71" | 710 m || 
|-id=769 bgcolor=#fefefe
| 511769 ||  || — || November 6, 2013 || Haleakala || Pan-STARRS ||  || align=right data-sort-value="0.58" | 580 m || 
|-id=770 bgcolor=#d6d6d6
| 511770 ||  || — || January 30, 2015 || Haleakala || Pan-STARRS || Tj (2.93) || align=right | 3.5 km || 
|-id=771 bgcolor=#fefefe
| 511771 ||  || — || March 27, 2008 || Mount Lemmon || Mount Lemmon Survey ||  || align=right data-sort-value="0.69" | 690 m || 
|-id=772 bgcolor=#E9E9E9
| 511772 ||  || — || May 2, 2011 || Catalina || CSS ||  || align=right | 1.4 km || 
|-id=773 bgcolor=#E9E9E9
| 511773 ||  || — || January 30, 2006 || Kitt Peak || Spacewatch ||  || align=right | 1.4 km || 
|-id=774 bgcolor=#fefefe
| 511774 ||  || — || February 16, 2015 || Haleakala || Pan-STARRS ||  || align=right data-sort-value="0.55" | 550 m || 
|-id=775 bgcolor=#E9E9E9
| 511775 ||  || — || May 4, 2006 || Mount Lemmon || Mount Lemmon Survey ||  || align=right | 1.9 km || 
|-id=776 bgcolor=#fefefe
| 511776 ||  || — || October 28, 2010 || Mount Lemmon || Mount Lemmon Survey ||  || align=right data-sort-value="0.60" | 600 m || 
|-id=777 bgcolor=#FFC2E0
| 511777 ||  || — || March 11, 2015 || Catalina || CSS || APO || align=right data-sort-value="0.19" | 190 m || 
|-id=778 bgcolor=#d6d6d6
| 511778 ||  || — || January 7, 2009 || Kitt Peak || Spacewatch ||  || align=right | 2.3 km || 
|-id=779 bgcolor=#fefefe
| 511779 ||  || — || March 17, 2004 || Kitt Peak || Spacewatch ||  || align=right data-sort-value="0.64" | 640 m || 
|-id=780 bgcolor=#E9E9E9
| 511780 ||  || — || October 26, 2013 || Mount Lemmon || Mount Lemmon Survey ||  || align=right | 1.8 km || 
|-id=781 bgcolor=#fefefe
| 511781 ||  || — || January 23, 2015 || Haleakala || Pan-STARRS ||  || align=right data-sort-value="0.68" | 680 m || 
|-id=782 bgcolor=#fefefe
| 511782 ||  || — || October 5, 2013 || Haleakala || Pan-STARRS ||  || align=right data-sort-value="0.68" | 680 m || 
|-id=783 bgcolor=#fefefe
| 511783 ||  || — || January 22, 2015 || Haleakala || Pan-STARRS ||  || align=right data-sort-value="0.65" | 650 m || 
|-id=784 bgcolor=#E9E9E9
| 511784 ||  || — || September 22, 2008 || Kitt Peak || Spacewatch ||  || align=right | 1.5 km || 
|-id=785 bgcolor=#fefefe
| 511785 ||  || — || January 29, 2011 || Mount Lemmon || Mount Lemmon Survey ||  || align=right data-sort-value="0.75" | 750 m || 
|-id=786 bgcolor=#d6d6d6
| 511786 ||  || — || April 12, 2010 || Kitt Peak || Spacewatch ||  || align=right | 2.2 km || 
|-id=787 bgcolor=#FA8072
| 511787 ||  || — || October 24, 2009 || Kitt Peak || Spacewatch ||  || align=right data-sort-value="0.86" | 860 m || 
|-id=788 bgcolor=#E9E9E9
| 511788 ||  || — || July 21, 2011 || Haleakala || Pan-STARRS ||  || align=right | 2.8 km || 
|-id=789 bgcolor=#E9E9E9
| 511789 ||  || — || September 15, 2012 || Catalina || CSS ||  || align=right | 2.2 km || 
|-id=790 bgcolor=#fefefe
| 511790 ||  || — || November 7, 2007 || Kitt Peak || Spacewatch ||  || align=right data-sort-value="0.82" | 820 m || 
|-id=791 bgcolor=#E9E9E9
| 511791 ||  || — || August 3, 2008 || Siding Spring || SSS ||  || align=right | 1.6 km || 
|-id=792 bgcolor=#E9E9E9
| 511792 ||  || — || July 15, 2004 || Siding Spring || SSS ||  || align=right | 1.5 km || 
|-id=793 bgcolor=#E9E9E9
| 511793 ||  || — || March 31, 2011 || Mount Lemmon || Mount Lemmon Survey ||  || align=right | 1.4 km || 
|-id=794 bgcolor=#E9E9E9
| 511794 ||  || — || October 18, 2012 || Haleakala || Pan-STARRS ||  || align=right | 2.0 km || 
|-id=795 bgcolor=#FA8072
| 511795 ||  || — || January 22, 2015 || Haleakala || Pan-STARRS ||  || align=right data-sort-value="0.56" | 560 m || 
|-id=796 bgcolor=#fefefe
| 511796 ||  || — || November 7, 2010 || Mount Lemmon || Mount Lemmon Survey ||  || align=right data-sort-value="0.95" | 950 m || 
|-id=797 bgcolor=#d6d6d6
| 511797 ||  || — || October 8, 2012 || Mount Lemmon || Mount Lemmon Survey ||  || align=right | 2.9 km || 
|-id=798 bgcolor=#E9E9E9
| 511798 ||  || — || January 12, 2010 || Catalina || CSS ||  || align=right | 1.2 km || 
|-id=799 bgcolor=#E9E9E9
| 511799 ||  || — || February 14, 2015 || Mount Lemmon || Mount Lemmon Survey ||  || align=right | 1.3 km || 
|-id=800 bgcolor=#fefefe
| 511800 ||  || — || February 4, 2011 || Haleakala || Pan-STARRS ||  || align=right data-sort-value="0.62" | 620 m || 
|}

511801–511900 

|-bgcolor=#fefefe
| 511801 ||  || — || May 14, 2005 || Kitt Peak || Spacewatch ||  || align=right data-sort-value="0.61" | 610 m || 
|-id=802 bgcolor=#fefefe
| 511802 ||  || — || April 14, 2008 || Mount Lemmon || Mount Lemmon Survey ||  || align=right data-sort-value="0.52" | 520 m || 
|-id=803 bgcolor=#fefefe
| 511803 ||  || — || April 10, 2005 || Kitt Peak || Spacewatch ||  || align=right data-sort-value="0.88" | 880 m || 
|-id=804 bgcolor=#fefefe
| 511804 ||  || — || March 28, 2008 || Mount Lemmon || Mount Lemmon Survey ||  || align=right data-sort-value="0.66" | 660 m || 
|-id=805 bgcolor=#fefefe
| 511805 ||  || — || July 18, 2013 || Haleakala || Pan-STARRS ||  || align=right | 1.3 km || 
|-id=806 bgcolor=#fefefe
| 511806 ||  || — || March 9, 2008 || Mount Lemmon || Mount Lemmon Survey ||  || align=right data-sort-value="0.71" | 710 m || 
|-id=807 bgcolor=#fefefe
| 511807 ||  || — || February 5, 2011 || Haleakala || Pan-STARRS ||  || align=right data-sort-value="0.91" | 910 m || 
|-id=808 bgcolor=#FFC2E0
| 511808 ||  || — || March 26, 2015 || Catalina || CSS || APO || align=right data-sort-value="0.75" | 750 m || 
|-id=809 bgcolor=#fefefe
| 511809 ||  || — || January 30, 2011 || Haleakala || Pan-STARRS || NYS || align=right data-sort-value="0.73" | 730 m || 
|-id=810 bgcolor=#fefefe
| 511810 ||  || — || January 30, 2008 || Kitt Peak || Spacewatch ||  || align=right data-sort-value="0.65" | 650 m || 
|-id=811 bgcolor=#fefefe
| 511811 ||  || — || April 1, 2011 || Kitt Peak || Spacewatch ||  || align=right | 1.1 km || 
|-id=812 bgcolor=#fefefe
| 511812 ||  || — || February 13, 2011 || Mount Lemmon || Mount Lemmon Survey || NYS || align=right data-sort-value="0.63" | 630 m || 
|-id=813 bgcolor=#fefefe
| 511813 ||  || — || April 14, 2004 || Kitt Peak || Spacewatch || NYS || align=right data-sort-value="0.51" | 510 m || 
|-id=814 bgcolor=#fefefe
| 511814 ||  || — || March 28, 2008 || Kitt Peak || Spacewatch ||  || align=right data-sort-value="0.75" | 750 m || 
|-id=815 bgcolor=#fefefe
| 511815 ||  || — || September 25, 2006 || Mount Lemmon || Mount Lemmon Survey ||  || align=right data-sort-value="0.62" | 620 m || 
|-id=816 bgcolor=#fefefe
| 511816 ||  || — || March 31, 2008 || Mount Lemmon || Mount Lemmon Survey ||  || align=right data-sort-value="0.58" | 580 m || 
|-id=817 bgcolor=#fefefe
| 511817 ||  || — || March 9, 2011 || Mount Lemmon || Mount Lemmon Survey ||  || align=right data-sort-value="0.72" | 720 m || 
|-id=818 bgcolor=#fefefe
| 511818 ||  || — || April 10, 2005 || Mount Lemmon || Mount Lemmon Survey ||  || align=right data-sort-value="0.71" | 710 m || 
|-id=819 bgcolor=#fefefe
| 511819 ||  || — || March 21, 2015 || Haleakala || Pan-STARRS ||  || align=right data-sort-value="0.61" | 610 m || 
|-id=820 bgcolor=#fefefe
| 511820 ||  || — || September 21, 2009 || Kitt Peak || Spacewatch || V || align=right data-sort-value="0.55" | 550 m || 
|-id=821 bgcolor=#fefefe
| 511821 ||  || — || January 23, 2015 || Haleakala || Pan-STARRS ||  || align=right data-sort-value="0.72" | 720 m || 
|-id=822 bgcolor=#E9E9E9
| 511822 ||  || — || April 26, 2011 || Mount Lemmon || Mount Lemmon Survey ||  || align=right | 1.5 km || 
|-id=823 bgcolor=#fefefe
| 511823 ||  || — || January 23, 2015 || Haleakala || Pan-STARRS ||  || align=right data-sort-value="0.77" | 770 m || 
|-id=824 bgcolor=#fefefe
| 511824 ||  || — || January 23, 2015 || Haleakala || Pan-STARRS ||  || align=right data-sort-value="0.69" | 690 m || 
|-id=825 bgcolor=#fefefe
| 511825 ||  || — || January 19, 2015 || Haleakala || Pan-STARRS ||  || align=right data-sort-value="0.63" | 630 m || 
|-id=826 bgcolor=#d6d6d6
| 511826 ||  || — || October 8, 2012 || Haleakala || Pan-STARRS ||  || align=right | 2.9 km || 
|-id=827 bgcolor=#fefefe
| 511827 ||  || — || January 14, 2011 || Kitt Peak || Spacewatch ||  || align=right data-sort-value="0.89" | 890 m || 
|-id=828 bgcolor=#E9E9E9
| 511828 ||  || — || November 29, 2014 || Haleakala || Pan-STARRS ||  || align=right | 1.4 km || 
|-id=829 bgcolor=#E9E9E9
| 511829 ||  || — || April 24, 2006 || Kitt Peak || Spacewatch ||  || align=right | 2.1 km || 
|-id=830 bgcolor=#fefefe
| 511830 ||  || — || February 13, 2008 || Mount Lemmon || Mount Lemmon Survey ||  || align=right data-sort-value="0.71" | 710 m || 
|-id=831 bgcolor=#E9E9E9
| 511831 ||  || — || June 27, 2011 || Mount Lemmon || Mount Lemmon Survey ||  || align=right | 1.8 km || 
|-id=832 bgcolor=#d6d6d6
| 511832 ||  || — || January 24, 2014 || Haleakala || Pan-STARRS ||  || align=right | 2.5 km || 
|-id=833 bgcolor=#fefefe
| 511833 ||  || — || August 21, 2012 || Haleakala || Pan-STARRS ||  || align=right data-sort-value="0.89" | 890 m || 
|-id=834 bgcolor=#E9E9E9
| 511834 ||  || — || December 30, 2013 || Haleakala || Pan-STARRS ||  || align=right | 2.2 km || 
|-id=835 bgcolor=#E9E9E9
| 511835 ||  || — || December 30, 2013 || Mount Lemmon || Mount Lemmon Survey ||  || align=right data-sort-value="0.96" | 960 m || 
|-id=836 bgcolor=#E9E9E9
| 511836 ||  || — || March 28, 2015 || Haleakala || Pan-STARRS ||  || align=right | 1.3 km || 
|-id=837 bgcolor=#fefefe
| 511837 ||  || — || October 2, 2006 || Mount Lemmon || Mount Lemmon Survey ||  || align=right data-sort-value="0.75" | 750 m || 
|-id=838 bgcolor=#fefefe
| 511838 ||  || — || December 3, 2010 || Kitt Peak || Spacewatch ||  || align=right data-sort-value="0.86" | 860 m || 
|-id=839 bgcolor=#E9E9E9
| 511839 ||  || — || January 16, 2005 || Kitt Peak || Spacewatch ||  || align=right | 2.6 km || 
|-id=840 bgcolor=#E9E9E9
| 511840 ||  || — || May 8, 2011 || Kitt Peak || Spacewatch ||  || align=right | 1.6 km || 
|-id=841 bgcolor=#fefefe
| 511841 ||  || — || November 26, 2013 || Haleakala || Pan-STARRS ||  || align=right data-sort-value="0.71" | 710 m || 
|-id=842 bgcolor=#fefefe
| 511842 ||  || — || February 10, 2007 || Mount Lemmon || Mount Lemmon Survey ||  || align=right data-sort-value="0.82" | 820 m || 
|-id=843 bgcolor=#fefefe
| 511843 ||  || — || October 28, 2013 || Mount Lemmon || Mount Lemmon Survey ||  || align=right data-sort-value="0.65" | 650 m || 
|-id=844 bgcolor=#fefefe
| 511844 ||  || — || February 7, 2008 || Mount Lemmon || Mount Lemmon Survey ||  || align=right data-sort-value="0.71" | 710 m || 
|-id=845 bgcolor=#E9E9E9
| 511845 ||  || — || March 25, 2015 || Haleakala || Pan-STARRS ||  || align=right | 1.6 km || 
|-id=846 bgcolor=#fefefe
| 511846 ||  || — || April 2, 2011 || Haleakala || Pan-STARRS ||  || align=right | 1.3 km || 
|-id=847 bgcolor=#fefefe
| 511847 ||  || — || March 24, 2015 || Mount Lemmon || Mount Lemmon Survey ||  || align=right data-sort-value="0.97" | 970 m || 
|-id=848 bgcolor=#E9E9E9
| 511848 ||  || — || December 27, 2005 || Kitt Peak || Spacewatch ||  || align=right | 1.1 km || 
|-id=849 bgcolor=#fefefe
| 511849 ||  || — || November 4, 2005 || Kitt Peak || Spacewatch || NYS || align=right data-sort-value="0.76" | 760 m || 
|-id=850 bgcolor=#E9E9E9
| 511850 ||  || — || March 30, 2015 || Haleakala || Pan-STARRS ||  || align=right | 2.1 km || 
|-id=851 bgcolor=#E9E9E9
| 511851 ||  || — || June 3, 2011 || Mount Lemmon || Mount Lemmon Survey ||  || align=right | 1.00 km || 
|-id=852 bgcolor=#E9E9E9
| 511852 ||  || — || December 11, 2013 || Haleakala || Pan-STARRS ||  || align=right | 1.8 km || 
|-id=853 bgcolor=#E9E9E9
| 511853 ||  || — || March 31, 2015 || Haleakala || Pan-STARRS || EUN || align=right | 1.3 km || 
|-id=854 bgcolor=#d6d6d6
| 511854 ||  || — || December 24, 2013 || Mount Lemmon || Mount Lemmon Survey ||  || align=right | 3.3 km || 
|-id=855 bgcolor=#d6d6d6
| 511855 ||  || — || November 2, 2008 || Mount Lemmon || Mount Lemmon Survey ||  || align=right | 2.9 km || 
|-id=856 bgcolor=#d6d6d6
| 511856 ||  || — || October 30, 2011 || Mount Lemmon || Mount Lemmon Survey ||  || align=right | 2.8 km || 
|-id=857 bgcolor=#fefefe
| 511857 ||  || — || March 16, 2012 || Haleakala || Pan-STARRS ||  || align=right data-sort-value="0.57" | 570 m || 
|-id=858 bgcolor=#fefefe
| 511858 ||  || — || October 3, 2006 || Mount Lemmon || Mount Lemmon Survey ||  || align=right data-sort-value="0.68" | 680 m || 
|-id=859 bgcolor=#E9E9E9
| 511859 ||  || — || December 18, 2009 || Mount Lemmon || Mount Lemmon Survey ||  || align=right | 1.1 km || 
|-id=860 bgcolor=#fefefe
| 511860 ||  || — || February 17, 2007 || Mount Lemmon || Mount Lemmon Survey ||  || align=right data-sort-value="0.84" | 840 m || 
|-id=861 bgcolor=#fefefe
| 511861 ||  || — || January 17, 2015 || Kitt Peak || Spacewatch ||  || align=right data-sort-value="0.73" | 730 m || 
|-id=862 bgcolor=#fefefe
| 511862 ||  || — || February 4, 2011 || Haleakala || Pan-STARRS ||  || align=right | 1.2 km || 
|-id=863 bgcolor=#E9E9E9
| 511863 ||  || — || May 3, 2011 || Mount Lemmon || Mount Lemmon Survey ||  || align=right | 1.1 km || 
|-id=864 bgcolor=#fefefe
| 511864 ||  || — || September 14, 2012 || Catalina || CSS ||  || align=right data-sort-value="0.67" | 670 m || 
|-id=865 bgcolor=#fefefe
| 511865 ||  || — || March 4, 2008 || Mount Lemmon || Mount Lemmon Survey ||  || align=right data-sort-value="0.58" | 580 m || 
|-id=866 bgcolor=#E9E9E9
| 511866 ||  || — || April 12, 2015 || Haleakala || Pan-STARRS ||  || align=right | 1.9 km || 
|-id=867 bgcolor=#E9E9E9
| 511867 ||  || — || February 2, 2006 || Kitt Peak || Spacewatch ||  || align=right | 1.3 km || 
|-id=868 bgcolor=#E9E9E9
| 511868 ||  || — || January 26, 2006 || Mount Lemmon || Mount Lemmon Survey ||  || align=right | 1.5 km || 
|-id=869 bgcolor=#fefefe
| 511869 ||  || — || November 26, 2009 || Kitt Peak || Spacewatch ||  || align=right | 1.00 km || 
|-id=870 bgcolor=#fefefe
| 511870 ||  || — || March 11, 2011 || Kitt Peak || Spacewatch ||  || align=right data-sort-value="0.72" | 720 m || 
|-id=871 bgcolor=#fefefe
| 511871 ||  || — || June 12, 2005 || Kitt Peak || Spacewatch ||  || align=right data-sort-value="0.62" | 620 m || 
|-id=872 bgcolor=#fefefe
| 511872 ||  || — || January 28, 2011 || Mount Lemmon || Mount Lemmon Survey ||  || align=right data-sort-value="0.64" | 640 m || 
|-id=873 bgcolor=#fefefe
| 511873 ||  || — || April 19, 2004 || Kitt Peak || Spacewatch ||  || align=right data-sort-value="0.68" | 680 m || 
|-id=874 bgcolor=#fefefe
| 511874 ||  || — || November 22, 2005 || Kitt Peak || Spacewatch ||  || align=right data-sort-value="0.69" | 690 m || 
|-id=875 bgcolor=#fefefe
| 511875 ||  || — || October 27, 2006 || Mount Lemmon || Mount Lemmon Survey ||  || align=right data-sort-value="0.71" | 710 m || 
|-id=876 bgcolor=#E9E9E9
| 511876 ||  || — || March 22, 2015 || Haleakala || Pan-STARRS ||  || align=right | 1.0 km || 
|-id=877 bgcolor=#fefefe
| 511877 ||  || — || September 28, 2013 || Mount Lemmon || Mount Lemmon Survey ||  || align=right data-sort-value="0.77" | 770 m || 
|-id=878 bgcolor=#fefefe
| 511878 ||  || — || December 31, 2007 || Mount Lemmon || Mount Lemmon Survey ||  || align=right data-sort-value="0.51" | 510 m || 
|-id=879 bgcolor=#fefefe
| 511879 ||  || — || January 30, 2011 || Haleakala || Pan-STARRS ||  || align=right | 1.1 km || 
|-id=880 bgcolor=#fefefe
| 511880 ||  || — || March 25, 2015 || Haleakala || Pan-STARRS ||  || align=right data-sort-value="0.74" | 740 m || 
|-id=881 bgcolor=#fefefe
| 511881 ||  || — || April 5, 2008 || Mount Lemmon || Mount Lemmon Survey ||  || align=right data-sort-value="0.66" | 660 m || 
|-id=882 bgcolor=#fefefe
| 511882 ||  || — || November 6, 2010 || Mount Lemmon || Mount Lemmon Survey ||  || align=right data-sort-value="0.59" | 590 m || 
|-id=883 bgcolor=#fefefe
| 511883 ||  || — || October 13, 2013 || Mount Lemmon || Mount Lemmon Survey ||  || align=right data-sort-value="0.76" | 760 m || 
|-id=884 bgcolor=#fefefe
| 511884 ||  || — || December 14, 2010 || Kitt Peak || Spacewatch ||  || align=right data-sort-value="0.71" | 710 m || 
|-id=885 bgcolor=#E9E9E9
| 511885 ||  || — || October 10, 2012 || Haleakala || Pan-STARRS ||  || align=right | 1.3 km || 
|-id=886 bgcolor=#d6d6d6
| 511886 ||  || — || October 8, 2012 || Haleakala || Pan-STARRS ||  || align=right | 2.3 km || 
|-id=887 bgcolor=#d6d6d6
| 511887 ||  || — || September 20, 2011 || Kitt Peak || Spacewatch ||  || align=right | 2.8 km || 
|-id=888 bgcolor=#E9E9E9
| 511888 ||  || — || September 24, 2008 || Catalina || CSS ||  || align=right | 1.6 km || 
|-id=889 bgcolor=#E9E9E9
| 511889 ||  || — || October 9, 2008 || Mount Lemmon || Mount Lemmon Survey ||  || align=right | 1.4 km || 
|-id=890 bgcolor=#fefefe
| 511890 ||  || — || January 1, 2014 || Haleakala || Pan-STARRS ||  || align=right data-sort-value="0.89" | 890 m || 
|-id=891 bgcolor=#fefefe
| 511891 ||  || — || May 2, 2008 || Kitt Peak || Spacewatch ||  || align=right data-sort-value="0.78" | 780 m || 
|-id=892 bgcolor=#fefefe
| 511892 ||  || — || May 14, 2008 || Mount Lemmon || Mount Lemmon Survey ||  || align=right data-sort-value="0.70" | 700 m || 
|-id=893 bgcolor=#fefefe
| 511893 ||  || — || September 21, 2009 || Kitt Peak || Spacewatch ||  || align=right data-sort-value="0.93" | 930 m || 
|-id=894 bgcolor=#E9E9E9
| 511894 ||  || — || April 27, 2011 || Haleakala || Pan-STARRS ||  || align=right data-sort-value="0.94" | 940 m || 
|-id=895 bgcolor=#E9E9E9
| 511895 ||  || — || October 16, 2012 || Mount Lemmon || Mount Lemmon Survey ||  || align=right | 1.5 km || 
|-id=896 bgcolor=#fefefe
| 511896 ||  || — || September 23, 2006 || Kitt Peak || Spacewatch ||  || align=right data-sort-value="0.76" | 760 m || 
|-id=897 bgcolor=#d6d6d6
| 511897 ||  || — || October 20, 2007 || Mount Lemmon || Mount Lemmon Survey ||  || align=right | 2.2 km || 
|-id=898 bgcolor=#E9E9E9
| 511898 ||  || — || August 9, 2007 || Socorro || LINEAR ||  || align=right | 2.6 km || 
|-id=899 bgcolor=#E9E9E9
| 511899 ||  || — || January 28, 2015 || Haleakala || Pan-STARRS ||  || align=right data-sort-value="0.99" | 990 m || 
|-id=900 bgcolor=#d6d6d6
| 511900 ||  || — || September 28, 2011 || Kitt Peak || Spacewatch ||  || align=right | 2.5 km || 
|}

511901–512000 

|-bgcolor=#fefefe
| 511901 ||  || — || January 17, 2007 || Kitt Peak || Spacewatch ||  || align=right data-sort-value="0.81" | 810 m || 
|-id=902 bgcolor=#fefefe
| 511902 ||  || — || March 15, 2008 || Mount Lemmon || Mount Lemmon Survey ||  || align=right data-sort-value="0.82" | 820 m || 
|-id=903 bgcolor=#d6d6d6
| 511903 ||  || — || April 8, 2010 || WISE || WISE || Tj (2.99) || align=right | 4.9 km || 
|-id=904 bgcolor=#E9E9E9
| 511904 ||  || — || June 21, 2007 || Mount Lemmon || Mount Lemmon Survey ||  || align=right | 1.3 km || 
|-id=905 bgcolor=#fefefe
| 511905 ||  || — || February 23, 2007 || Mount Lemmon || Mount Lemmon Survey ||  || align=right | 1.00 km || 
|-id=906 bgcolor=#fefefe
| 511906 ||  || — || January 27, 2007 || Mount Lemmon || Mount Lemmon Survey ||  || align=right data-sort-value="0.62" | 620 m || 
|-id=907 bgcolor=#fefefe
| 511907 ||  || — || February 8, 2007 || Mount Lemmon || Mount Lemmon Survey ||  || align=right data-sort-value="0.92" | 920 m || 
|-id=908 bgcolor=#E9E9E9
| 511908 ||  || — || October 11, 1999 || Kitt Peak || Spacewatch ||  || align=right data-sort-value="0.79" | 790 m || 
|-id=909 bgcolor=#fefefe
| 511909 ||  || — || March 9, 2007 || Mount Lemmon || Mount Lemmon Survey ||  || align=right data-sort-value="0.75" | 750 m || 
|-id=910 bgcolor=#E9E9E9
| 511910 ||  || — || November 2, 2013 || Mount Lemmon || Mount Lemmon Survey ||  || align=right data-sort-value="0.75" | 750 m || 
|-id=911 bgcolor=#E9E9E9
| 511911 ||  || — || April 20, 2007 || Kitt Peak || Spacewatch ||  || align=right data-sort-value="0.68" | 680 m || 
|-id=912 bgcolor=#d6d6d6
| 511912 ||  || — || November 12, 2012 || Mount Lemmon || Mount Lemmon Survey ||  || align=right | 3.0 km || 
|-id=913 bgcolor=#E9E9E9
| 511913 ||  || — || March 19, 2015 || Haleakala || Pan-STARRS ||  || align=right | 1.4 km || 
|-id=914 bgcolor=#fefefe
| 511914 ||  || — || April 19, 2004 || Socorro || LINEAR ||  || align=right data-sort-value="0.85" | 850 m || 
|-id=915 bgcolor=#E9E9E9
| 511915 ||  || — || April 21, 2006 || Kitt Peak || Spacewatch ||  || align=right | 2.3 km || 
|-id=916 bgcolor=#E9E9E9
| 511916 ||  || — || January 1, 2014 || Haleakala || Pan-STARRS ||  || align=right | 1.1 km || 
|-id=917 bgcolor=#fefefe
| 511917 ||  || — || November 2, 2013 || Mount Lemmon || Mount Lemmon Survey ||  || align=right data-sort-value="0.77" | 770 m || 
|-id=918 bgcolor=#fefefe
| 511918 ||  || — || March 14, 2007 || Kitt Peak || Spacewatch ||  || align=right data-sort-value="0.95" | 950 m || 
|-id=919 bgcolor=#E9E9E9
| 511919 ||  || — || September 30, 2008 || La Sagra || OAM Obs. ||  || align=right data-sort-value="0.97" | 970 m || 
|-id=920 bgcolor=#E9E9E9
| 511920 ||  || — || March 25, 2015 || Haleakala || Pan-STARRS ||  || align=right | 2.4 km || 
|-id=921 bgcolor=#E9E9E9
| 511921 ||  || — || August 23, 2007 || Kitt Peak || Spacewatch ||  || align=right | 2.3 km || 
|-id=922 bgcolor=#fefefe
| 511922 ||  || — || March 15, 2004 || Kitt Peak || Spacewatch ||  || align=right data-sort-value="0.57" | 570 m || 
|-id=923 bgcolor=#d6d6d6
| 511923 ||  || — || April 23, 2015 || Haleakala || Pan-STARRS ||  || align=right | 2.3 km || 
|-id=924 bgcolor=#E9E9E9
| 511924 ||  || — || September 23, 2012 || Mount Lemmon || Mount Lemmon Survey ||  || align=right data-sort-value="0.73" | 730 m || 
|-id=925 bgcolor=#d6d6d6
| 511925 ||  || — || February 24, 2014 || Haleakala || Pan-STARRS ||  || align=right | 3.6 km || 
|-id=926 bgcolor=#fefefe
| 511926 ||  || — || April 14, 2008 || Mount Lemmon || Mount Lemmon Survey ||  || align=right data-sort-value="0.78" | 780 m || 
|-id=927 bgcolor=#E9E9E9
| 511927 ||  || — || October 16, 2012 || Mount Lemmon || Mount Lemmon Survey ||  || align=right | 1.1 km || 
|-id=928 bgcolor=#fefefe
| 511928 ||  || — || February 4, 2011 || Haleakala || Pan-STARRS ||  || align=right data-sort-value="0.87" | 870 m || 
|-id=929 bgcolor=#fefefe
| 511929 ||  || — || December 9, 2006 || Kitt Peak || Spacewatch ||  || align=right data-sort-value="0.75" | 750 m || 
|-id=930 bgcolor=#E9E9E9
| 511930 ||  || — || October 7, 2008 || Mount Lemmon || Mount Lemmon Survey ||  || align=right data-sort-value="0.94" | 940 m || 
|-id=931 bgcolor=#E9E9E9
| 511931 ||  || — || December 2, 2008 || Kitt Peak || Spacewatch ||  || align=right | 2.2 km || 
|-id=932 bgcolor=#E9E9E9
| 511932 ||  || — || February 25, 2015 || Haleakala || Pan-STARRS ||  || align=right data-sort-value="0.99" | 990 m || 
|-id=933 bgcolor=#E9E9E9
| 511933 ||  || — || April 24, 2015 || Haleakala || Pan-STARRS || MAR || align=right data-sort-value="0.93" | 930 m || 
|-id=934 bgcolor=#fefefe
| 511934 ||  || — || March 26, 2011 || Mount Lemmon || Mount Lemmon Survey ||  || align=right data-sort-value="0.81" | 810 m || 
|-id=935 bgcolor=#fefefe
| 511935 ||  || — || February 8, 2011 || Mount Lemmon || Mount Lemmon Survey ||  || align=right data-sort-value="0.65" | 650 m || 
|-id=936 bgcolor=#fefefe
| 511936 ||  || — || March 10, 2005 || Mount Lemmon || Mount Lemmon Survey ||  || align=right data-sort-value="0.70" | 700 m || 
|-id=937 bgcolor=#d6d6d6
| 511937 ||  || — || November 27, 2006 || Mount Lemmon || Mount Lemmon Survey || Tj (2.98) || align=right | 4.1 km || 
|-id=938 bgcolor=#fefefe
| 511938 ||  || — || May 28, 2000 || Socorro || LINEAR ||  || align=right data-sort-value="0.89" | 890 m || 
|-id=939 bgcolor=#fefefe
| 511939 ||  || — || March 16, 2004 || Siding Spring || SSS ||  || align=right | 1.2 km || 
|-id=940 bgcolor=#fefefe
| 511940 ||  || — || February 9, 2005 || Mount Lemmon || Mount Lemmon Survey ||  || align=right data-sort-value="0.73" | 730 m || 
|-id=941 bgcolor=#fefefe
| 511941 ||  || — || April 12, 2004 || Kitt Peak || Spacewatch ||  || align=right data-sort-value="0.97" | 970 m || 
|-id=942 bgcolor=#fefefe
| 511942 ||  || — || February 11, 2004 || Kitt Peak || Spacewatch ||  || align=right data-sort-value="0.78" | 780 m || 
|-id=943 bgcolor=#fefefe
| 511943 ||  || — || June 3, 2008 || Mount Lemmon || Mount Lemmon Survey || V || align=right data-sort-value="0.78" | 780 m || 
|-id=944 bgcolor=#E9E9E9
| 511944 ||  || — || April 4, 2015 || Haleakala || Pan-STARRS ||  || align=right | 1.6 km || 
|-id=945 bgcolor=#fefefe
| 511945 ||  || — || March 25, 2011 || Catalina || CSS ||  || align=right data-sort-value="0.97" | 970 m || 
|-id=946 bgcolor=#E9E9E9
| 511946 ||  || — || March 18, 2010 || Mount Lemmon || Mount Lemmon Survey ||  || align=right | 2.3 km || 
|-id=947 bgcolor=#E9E9E9
| 511947 ||  || — || October 15, 2004 || Mount Lemmon || Mount Lemmon Survey ||  || align=right data-sort-value="0.85" | 850 m || 
|-id=948 bgcolor=#fefefe
| 511948 ||  || — || October 28, 2005 || Mount Lemmon || Mount Lemmon Survey ||  || align=right data-sort-value="0.81" | 810 m || 
|-id=949 bgcolor=#E9E9E9
| 511949 ||  || — || November 28, 2013 || Mount Lemmon || Mount Lemmon Survey ||  || align=right data-sort-value="0.86" | 860 m || 
|-id=950 bgcolor=#E9E9E9
| 511950 ||  || — || February 25, 2006 || Kitt Peak || Spacewatch ||  || align=right | 1.3 km || 
|-id=951 bgcolor=#E9E9E9
| 511951 ||  || — || February 14, 2010 || Mount Lemmon || Mount Lemmon Survey ||  || align=right | 1.8 km || 
|-id=952 bgcolor=#E9E9E9
| 511952 ||  || — || April 4, 2010 || Kitt Peak || Spacewatch ||  || align=right | 1.8 km || 
|-id=953 bgcolor=#E9E9E9
| 511953 ||  || — || November 11, 2004 || Kitt Peak || Spacewatch ||  || align=right | 2.1 km || 
|-id=954 bgcolor=#fefefe
| 511954 ||  || — || January 20, 2015 || Haleakala || Pan-STARRS ||  || align=right data-sort-value="0.73" | 730 m || 
|-id=955 bgcolor=#E9E9E9
| 511955 ||  || – || September 6, 2012 || Mount Lemmon || Mount Lemmon Survey ||  || align=right | 1.1 km || 
|-id=956 bgcolor=#fefefe
| 511956 ||  || — || April 4, 2005 || Kitt Peak || Spacewatch ||  || align=right data-sort-value="0.69" | 690 m || 
|-id=957 bgcolor=#fefefe
| 511957 ||  || — || October 13, 2006 || Kitt Peak || Spacewatch ||  || align=right data-sort-value="0.80" | 800 m || 
|-id=958 bgcolor=#E9E9E9
| 511958 ||  || — || June 10, 2011 || Mount Lemmon || Mount Lemmon Survey ||  || align=right | 1.1 km || 
|-id=959 bgcolor=#E9E9E9
| 511959 ||  || — || April 29, 2011 || Mount Lemmon || Mount Lemmon Survey ||  || align=right | 1.4 km || 
|-id=960 bgcolor=#d6d6d6
| 511960 ||  || — || May 18, 2015 || Haleakala || Pan-STARRS ||  || align=right | 2.4 km || 
|-id=961 bgcolor=#E9E9E9
| 511961 ||  || — || January 28, 2014 || Catalina || CSS ||  || align=right | 2.1 km || 
|-id=962 bgcolor=#E9E9E9
| 511962 ||  || — || May 25, 2006 || Kitt Peak || Spacewatch ||  || align=right | 1.3 km || 
|-id=963 bgcolor=#E9E9E9
| 511963 ||  || — || May 20, 2006 || Mount Lemmon || Mount Lemmon Survey ||  || align=right | 1.9 km || 
|-id=964 bgcolor=#d6d6d6
| 511964 ||  || — || June 15, 2005 || Kitt Peak || Spacewatch ||  || align=right | 2.5 km || 
|-id=965 bgcolor=#E9E9E9
| 511965 ||  || — || May 16, 2010 || WISE || WISE ||  || align=right | 2.4 km || 
|-id=966 bgcolor=#E9E9E9
| 511966 ||  || — || March 30, 2015 || Haleakala || Pan-STARRS ||  || align=right | 2.2 km || 
|-id=967 bgcolor=#E9E9E9
| 511967 ||  || — || October 25, 2003 || Kitt Peak || Spacewatch ||  || align=right | 2.6 km || 
|-id=968 bgcolor=#E9E9E9
| 511968 ||  || — || October 20, 2012 || Haleakala || Pan-STARRS ||  || align=right | 2.1 km || 
|-id=969 bgcolor=#d6d6d6
| 511969 ||  || — || November 17, 2006 || Mount Lemmon || Mount Lemmon Survey ||  || align=right | 3.4 km || 
|-id=970 bgcolor=#d6d6d6
| 511970 ||  || — || November 27, 2012 || Mount Lemmon || Mount Lemmon Survey ||  || align=right | 3.2 km || 
|-id=971 bgcolor=#E9E9E9
| 511971 ||  || — || November 3, 2012 || Mount Lemmon || Mount Lemmon Survey ||  || align=right data-sort-value="0.85" | 850 m || 
|-id=972 bgcolor=#fefefe
| 511972 ||  || — || April 13, 2004 || Kitt Peak || Spacewatch ||  || align=right data-sort-value="0.62" | 620 m || 
|-id=973 bgcolor=#E9E9E9
| 511973 ||  || — || June 12, 2010 || WISE || WISE ||  || align=right | 3.2 km || 
|-id=974 bgcolor=#E9E9E9
| 511974 ||  || — || June 22, 2011 || Mount Lemmon || Mount Lemmon Survey ||  || align=right | 1.3 km || 
|-id=975 bgcolor=#d6d6d6
| 511975 ||  || — || May 21, 2010 || WISE || WISE ||  || align=right | 3.5 km || 
|-id=976 bgcolor=#fefefe
| 511976 ||  || — || March 17, 2015 || Haleakala || Pan-STARRS ||  || align=right data-sort-value="0.86" | 860 m || 
|-id=977 bgcolor=#fefefe
| 511977 ||  || — || March 29, 2011 || Mount Lemmon || Mount Lemmon Survey ||  || align=right data-sort-value="0.75" | 750 m || 
|-id=978 bgcolor=#E9E9E9
| 511978 ||  || — || May 1, 2011 || Haleakala || Pan-STARRS ||  || align=right data-sort-value="0.76" | 760 m || 
|-id=979 bgcolor=#E9E9E9
| 511979 ||  || — || June 6, 2011 || Haleakala || Pan-STARRS ||  || align=right data-sort-value="0.88" | 880 m || 
|-id=980 bgcolor=#E9E9E9
| 511980 ||  || — || November 2, 1999 || Kitt Peak || Spacewatch || fast? || align=right | 1.1 km || 
|-id=981 bgcolor=#E9E9E9
| 511981 ||  || — || February 4, 2005 || Kitt Peak || Spacewatch ||  || align=right | 1.6 km || 
|-id=982 bgcolor=#E9E9E9
| 511982 ||  || — || December 18, 2003 || Socorro || LINEAR ||  || align=right | 3.2 km || 
|-id=983 bgcolor=#E9E9E9
| 511983 ||  || — || December 4, 2013 || Haleakala || Pan-STARRS ||  || align=right | 1.6 km || 
|-id=984 bgcolor=#d6d6d6
| 511984 ||  || — || May 9, 2010 || WISE || WISE ||  || align=right | 3.0 km || 
|-id=985 bgcolor=#E9E9E9
| 511985 ||  || — || June 30, 2011 || Haleakala || Pan-STARRS ||  || align=right | 2.1 km || 
|-id=986 bgcolor=#fefefe
| 511986 ||  || — || February 23, 2007 || Catalina || CSS ||  || align=right data-sort-value="0.78" | 780 m || 
|-id=987 bgcolor=#E9E9E9
| 511987 ||  || — || November 12, 2012 || Haleakala || Pan-STARRS ||  || align=right | 1.7 km || 
|-id=988 bgcolor=#E9E9E9
| 511988 ||  || — || June 3, 2011 || Mount Lemmon || Mount Lemmon Survey || MAR || align=right data-sort-value="0.78" | 780 m || 
|-id=989 bgcolor=#d6d6d6
| 511989 ||  || — || March 31, 2015 || Haleakala || Pan-STARRS ||  || align=right | 2.5 km || 
|-id=990 bgcolor=#fefefe
| 511990 ||  || — || February 21, 2007 || Kitt Peak || Spacewatch || V || align=right data-sort-value="0.69" | 690 m || 
|-id=991 bgcolor=#fefefe
| 511991 ||  || — || March 17, 2004 || Kitt Peak || Spacewatch ||  || align=right data-sort-value="0.65" | 650 m || 
|-id=992 bgcolor=#fefefe
| 511992 ||  || — || December 18, 2007 || Mount Lemmon || Mount Lemmon Survey ||  || align=right data-sort-value="0.61" | 610 m || 
|-id=993 bgcolor=#fefefe
| 511993 ||  || — || November 27, 2013 || Haleakala || Pan-STARRS || V || align=right data-sort-value="0.68" | 680 m || 
|-id=994 bgcolor=#E9E9E9
| 511994 ||  || — || December 8, 2012 || Mount Lemmon || Mount Lemmon Survey || GEF || align=right | 1.3 km || 
|-id=995 bgcolor=#fefefe
| 511995 ||  || — || October 29, 2005 || Kitt Peak || Spacewatch ||  || align=right data-sort-value="0.90" | 900 m || 
|-id=996 bgcolor=#E9E9E9
| 511996 ||  || — || April 27, 2011 || Haleakala || Pan-STARRS ||  || align=right data-sort-value="0.98" | 980 m || 
|-id=997 bgcolor=#E9E9E9
| 511997 ||  || — || November 8, 2013 || Mount Lemmon || Mount Lemmon Survey || EUN || align=right | 1.2 km || 
|-id=998 bgcolor=#d6d6d6
| 511998 ||  || — || April 11, 2015 || Kitt Peak || Spacewatch ||  || align=right | 2.6 km || 
|-id=999 bgcolor=#fefefe
| 511999 ||  || — || November 17, 2006 || Mount Lemmon || Mount Lemmon Survey ||  || align=right data-sort-value="0.79" | 790 m || 
|-id=000 bgcolor=#E9E9E9
| 512000 ||  || — || January 26, 2014 || Haleakala || Pan-STARRS ||  || align=right | 2.0 km || 
|}

References

External links 
 Discovery Circumstances: Numbered Minor Planets (510001)–(515000) (IAU Minor Planet Center)

0511